= Łempicki =

Łempicki (feminine: Łempicka; plural: Łempiccy) is a Polish surname.

- Aleksander Lempicki (1922–2007), Polish-American physicist on List of American Physical Society Fellows (1921–1971)
- Dorota Łempicka (1926–1944), Polish underground army fighter during World War II, alongside Anna Zakrzewska
- Ignacy Łempicki (general) (before 1740–after 1767), Polish Crown Army Royal Adjutant
- Ignacy Łempicki (diplomat) (1766–after 1804), Polish diplomat and military officer, son of above
- Jadwiga Gamska-Łempicka (1903–1956), Polish poet, wife of Stanisław Łempicki, wrote for Kurjer Lubelski
- Lolita Lempicka (born 1954), French fashion designer and perfumer's professional name and brand
- Michał Łempicki (1856–1930), Polish mining engineer and entrepreneur
- Stanisław Łempicki (1886–1947), Polish cultural historian, academic and linguist, husband of Jadwiga Gamska-Łempicka
- Tamara Łempicka (1898–1980), Polish Art Deco painter a/k/a Tamara de Lempicka
- Zygmunt Łempicki (1886–1943), Polish literature theoretician, Germanist and philosopher

== See also ==
- Lempicka (musical), 2018 play based on life of Tamara Łempicka
