= Ignacy Łempicki =

Ignacy Łempicki may refer to:

- Ignacy Łempicki (general) (18th century), major general of the Army of the Crown of the Polish Kingdom
- Ignacy Łempicki (diplomat) (1766–?), chargé d'affaires of the Polish–Lithuanian Commonwealth in Vienna
- Ignacy Łempicki (November insurgent) (1801–1876), military officer in the November uprising
