= Indirect speech =

Speech expressing things other people have said without quoting

In linguistics, speech or indirect discourse is a grammatical mechanism for reporting the content of another utterance without directly quoting it. For example, the English sentence Jill said she was coming is indirect discourse while Jill said "I'm coming" would be direct discourse. In fiction, the "utterance" might amount to an unvoiced thought that passes through a stream of consciousness, as reported by an omniscient narrator.

In many languages, indirect discourse is expressed using a content clause or infinitival. When an instance of indirect discourse reports an earlier question, the embedded clause takes the form of an indirect question. In indirect speech, grammatical categories in the embedded clause often differ from those in the utterance it reports. For instance, the example above uses the third person pronoun "she" even though Jill's original utterance used the first person pronoun "I". In some languages, including English, the tense of verbs can also be changed following the sequence of tense. Some languages also have a change of mood. For instance Latin indirect speech uses the infinitive for statements and the subjunctive for questions.

== Changes in form ==
In indirect speech, words generally have referents appropriate to the context in which the act of reporting takes place, rather than that in which the speech act being reported took place (or is conceived as taking place). The two acts often differ in a reference point (origo) – the point in time and place and the person speaking – and also in the person being addressed and the linguistic context. Thus when a sentence involves words or forms whose referents depend on these circumstances, they are liable to change when the sentence is put into indirect speech. In particular, this commonly affects:

- personal pronouns, such as I, you, he, we, and the corresponding verb forms (in pro-drop languages the meaning of the pronoun may be conveyed solely by verb inflection).
- demonstratives, such as this and that.
- phrases of relative time or place such as now, yesterday and here.

There may also be a change of tense or other modifications to the form of the verb, such as change of mood. These changes depend on the grammar of the language in question – some examples can be found in the following sections.

Indirect speech need not refer to a speech act that has actually taken place; it may concern future or hypothetical discourse; for example, If you ask him why he's wearing that hat, he'll tell you to mind your own business. Also, even when referring to a known completed speech act, the reporter may deviate freely from the words that were actually used, provided the meaning is retained. This contrasts with direct speech, where there is an expectation that the original words will be reproduced exactly.

== Ambiguity ==
Some modal verbs (would, could, might, should, ought to) do not change in indirect speech. The indirect speech sentence is then ambiguous since it can be a result of two different direct speech sentences. For example:

- I can get it for free. OR I could get it for free.
  He said that he could get it for free. (ambiguity)

However, in many Slavic languages, there is no change of tense in indirect speech and so there is no ambiguity. For example, in Polish (a male speaker, hence third person masculine singular):

- Mogę mieć to za darmo. (I can get it for free)
  On powiedział, że może mieć to za darmo. (literally: He said that he can get it for free.)

== Examples ==
=== English ===
Some examples of changes in form in indirect speech in English are given below. See also Sequence of tenses, and Uses of English verb forms § Indirect speech.

- It is raining hard.
  She says that it is raining hard. (no change)
  She said that it was raining hard. (change of tense when the main verb is past tense)
- I have painted the ceiling blue.
  He said that he had painted the ceiling blue. (change of person and tense)
- I shall come to your party tomorrow.
  I said that I would come to his party the next day/the following day. (change of shall to would, person and time expression)
- Will you come to my party tomorrow?
  I asked if he/she would come to my party the next day/the following day. (change of will to would, person and time expression)
- How do people manage to live in this city?
  I asked him how people managed to live in that city. (change of tense and question syntax, and of demonstrative)
- Please leave the room.
  I asked them to leave the room. (use of infinitive phrase)
- I am a traitor...
  You believe me to be a traitor... (use of infinitive phrase)

The tense changes illustrated above (also called backshifting), which occur because the main verb ("said", "asked") is in the past tense, are not obligatory when the situation described is still valid:

- Ed is a bore.
  She said that Ed was/is a bore. (optional change of tense)
- I am coming over to watch television.
  Benjamin said that he is/was coming over to watch television. (change of person, optional change of tense)

In these sentences, the original tense can be used provided that it remains equally valid at the time of the reporting of the statement (Ed is still considered a bore; Benjamin is still expected to come over).

=== Ancient Greek ===
In Ancient Greek, statements and questions that are reported are sometimes quoted by using indirect statements and questions.

There are three types of indirect statements and one type of indirect question, but all are introduced with a verb of thought, belief, speaking, or questioning.

Verbs such as φημὶ require no additional introductory particle. The quoted speech is rendered with the following changes: the finite verb is transformed into the corresponding infinitive, and the nominative subject and the predicate are transformed into the accusative. The accusative object remains unchanged. Tense, voice, and number remain unchanged.

- αὕτη ἡ γυνή (nom.) ἐστι καλή (nom.) "This woman is pretty."
- ὁ ἀνήρ φησι ταύτην τὴν γυναῖκα (acc.) εἶναι καλήν (acc.) "The man says (that) this woman is pretty."

Verbs such as γιγνώσκω require no additional introductory particle. However, the nominative subject, and the predicate, if present, are changed into the accusative case, and the finite verb, agreeing with them, is changed into the corresponding participle in the accusative case. The accusative object remains unchanged. Tense, voice, and number remain unchanged.

- ὁ ἀνὴρ γιγνώσκει ταύτην τὴν γυναῖκα οὖσαν καλήν. "The man knows (that) this woman is pretty."

With the two species of indirect statements above, however, if the subject of the quoted speech is the same as its speaker, the subject is omitted and is understood in the nominative, and the predicate, if present, remains in the nominative case.

Verbs such as λέγω require either ὡς or ὅτι as an introductory particle. If the introductory verb is in a secondary tense, the finite verb of the ὡς/ὅτι clause is usually changed from the indicative mood into the corresponding tense in the optative mood, but the indicative verb is sometimes retained for vividness.

- ἡ γυνή ἐστι καλή. "The woman is beautiful."
- ὁ ἀνὴρ ἔλεγεν ὡς ἡ γυνὴ εἴη (present optative) καλή/ἐστι (present indicative) καλή. "The man said that the woman was beautiful."

=== Latin ===
In Latin grammar, indirect speech is called ōrātiō oblīqua (direct speech is called ōrātiō recta). An indirect statement or question can replace the direct object of a verb that is related to thought or communication.

An indirect statement is expressed by changing the case of the subject noun phrase from nominative to accusative and by replacing the main verb with an infinitive (as in the English phrase "You believe me to be a traitor" above). The voice remains unchanged, but the tense of the infinitive is controlled mostly by the temporal relationship between the time expressed by the matrix verb's tense and the time denoted by the infinitive. The present tense at the moment of utterance (a simultaneous state of affairs between the matrix verb and the infinitive) is expressed by the present infinitive. The past tense (the infinitive's state of affairs is before that of the matrix verb) is expressed by the perfect infinitive. The future tense (a time posterior after that of matrix verb) is expressed by the future infinitive.

Practically, six tenses of the indicative must be transformed into three available infinitival tenses. An accurate reproduction of the full temporal sense of direct speech is thus often impossible:

- Amo libertatem. ("I love freedom")
  Dicit se amare libertatem. ("He says that he loves freedom")
- Rex dedit omnibus leges. ("The king gave laws to everyone")
  Credo regem dedisse omnibus leges. ("I believe that the king gave laws to everyone")
- Videbimus permulta cras. ("We shall see very many things tomorrow")
  Speras nos visuros esse permulta cras. ("You hope that we shall see very many things tomorrow")
- Tertium non datur. ("No third possibility is given")
  Docuit philosophus tertium non dari. ("The philosopher taught that no third possibility is given")
- In Senatu imperator interfectus est. ("The emperor was killed in the Senate")
  Audivi imperatorem in Senatu interfectum esse. ("I heard that the emperor was killed in the Senate")

As is shown from the first example, even a coreferent subject must be expressed in the accusative if its clause is put into the infinitive. The accusative of reflexive pronouns is used in the corresponding person and number (singular: me, te, se; plural: nos, vos, se).

For predication by a copula (typically, esse), the case of the predicate adjective or noun changes from nominative to accusative. The same happens to any syntactic constituent that stood in the nominative case before it became indirect speech.

- Sum felix. ("I am happy")
  Dixit se esse felicem. ("He said that he was happy")
- Cadam pugnans. ("I shall fall dead while fighting") (A participle in the nominative.)
  Dicit se casurum esse pugnantem. ("He says that he will fall dead while fighting") (The participle is now in the accusative and agrees in case to the accusative agent, denoted by the pronoun se)

After passive verbs of speaking, reporting, thinking, or perceiving, the nominative with infinitive (Latin: Nominativus cum infinitivo) is generally preferred, especially after monolectic matrix verb types. That construction is called, in generative linguistics, subject-to-subject raising: the noun phrase (in the accusative) is detached from the infinitive and is raised as the nominative subject of the matrix passive verb:

- Dicitur [Homerum caecum fuisse]. Impersonal construction: the infinitival clause serves as the subject of the verb dicitur.
  Dicitur Homerus [caecus fuisse]. Personal construction: the noun Homerus in the nominative serves as the subject of the verb dicitur (and is implied also as the subject of the infinitive fuisse). The whole infinitival clause is said to serve now as the object of the verb dicitur (that is not exactly accepted by modern linguistic approaches to subject-to-subject raising phenomena).

If an imperfect or a pluperfect was initially used in direct speech, the perfect infinitive is normally used instead, as it the only one capable of denoting a state of affairs earlier than the one denoted by the matrix verb that introduces the indirect speech.

- Cogitabam/Cogitaveram aliquid. ("I was thinking/had thought something")
  Dixit se cogita(vi)sse aliquid ("He said that he had been thinking/had thought something")

(Sometimes, the present infinitive is used as the representative of the imperfect indicative and so it is called, by some grammarians, the imperfect infinitive.)

The future perfect indicative, a tense denoting a state of affairs completed in the future and so later than another state of affairs in the future, becomes, according to at least some grammarians, the circumlocution fore ut + perfect of pluperfect subjunctive, in accordance to the sequence of tenses at hand, a sort of substantive consecutive clause serving as subject of the infinitive fore. In the passive, a form of the periphrastic infinitive -tus fore is normally used:

- Cogitavero aliquid. ("I shall have thought something")
  Dixit fore ut cogita(vi)sset aliquid ("He said that he should have thought something")
- Urbs expugnata erit ("The city will have been captured")
  Dixit urbem expugnatam fore ("He said that the city would have been captured")

A potential subjunctive is changed to some sort of periphrastic infinitive: a present subjunctive becomes -urum esse or posse, followed by the present infinitive; an imperfect or pluperfect subjunctive becomes -urum fuisse:

- Urbem capiam ("I would/can/may capture the city.")
  Dixit se urbem capturum esse/capere posse ("He said that he would/could/might capture the city.")
- Urbem caperem ("I would/could/might be capturing the city; I could/might have captured the city (poetic).")
  Dixit se urbem capturum fuisse ("He said that he would/could/might be capturing the city.")
- Urbem cepissem ("I would/could/might have captured the city.")
  Dixit se urbem capturum fuisse ("He said that he would/could/might have captured the city.")

An indirect question is expressed by changing the mood of the main verb from the indicative to the subjunctive. Some rhetoric questions change the verb to the accusative, followed by the infinitive, as if it were a real declarative statement in direct speech). It is normally appropriate to retain the word that introduces the question, but a relative pronoun or adverb is occasionally used instead of one that is initially interrogative. The subjunctive tense is controlled by the Sequence of Tenses. Its sequence depends on the tense of the matrix verb of asking, perceiving etc. by which the indirect question is introduced:

1. The present indicative becomes the present subjunctive after a primary tense (present, future, future perfect of primary perfect), but it turns into the imperfect subjunctive after a secondary tense (a past tense: imperfect, secondary perfect, pluperfect and, occasionally, historic present):

- Quis hoc dubitat? ("Who doubts this?")
  Quaerit quis (or: qui) hoc dubitet. ("He asks who doubts this.")
  Quaesivit quis (or: qui) hoc dubitaret. ("He asked who was doubting this.")

2. The future indicative is turned into the periphrastic conjugation in -urus sim (the present periphrastic subjunctive is used as the future subjunctive) or -urus essem (the imperfect periphrastic subjunctive).

- Quis hoc dubitabit? ("Who will doubt this?")
  Quaerit quis (or: qui) hoc dubitaturus sit. ("He asks who will doubt this.")
  Quaesivit quis (or: qui) hoc dubitaturus esset. ("He asked who would doubt this.")

However, the use of present subjunctive after a primary tense and imperfect subjunctive after a secondary tense is also often attested, especially if the future reference is obvious from the context and for a passive verb (passives lack the periphrastic conjugation -urus sim).

3. The imperfect, perfect, pluperfect and future perfect indicative are turned into the perfect or pluperfect subjunctive after primary and secondary tenses respectively:

- Quis hoc dubitabat/dubitavit/dubita(ve)rat/dubita(ve)rit? ("Who was doubting/doubted/had doubted/will have doubted this?")
  Quaerit quis (or: qui) hoc dubita(ve)rit. ("He asks who was doubting/had doubted/will have doubted this.")
  Quaesivit quis (or: qui) hoc dubita(vi)sset. ("He asked who had been doubting/would have been doubting this.")

A deliberative subjunctive, always in the present tense in direct speech, is always retained in an indirect question. The tense of the direct form is unchanged unless the matrix verb had a secondary tense, when the present tense becomes imperfect. An initially secondary subjunctive, the imperfect, is retained, regardless of the tense into which the matrix verb is changed, primary or secondary:

- Quid scribam? ("What am I to write?")
  Nescit quid scribat. ("He doesn't know what to write.")
  Nesciebat quid scriberet. ("He didn't know what to write.")
- Quid scriberem? ("What do you think I ought to have done?")
  Nescit/nesciebat quid scriberet. ("He does/did not know what to write.")

The potential subjunctive is retained as well. Primary subjunctives are changed to the corresponding secondary subjunctives, which stay the same. The idea of possibility is often expressed by periphrases: by -urus sim, essem, fuerim, fuissem and by a subjunctive tense of possum + present infinitive:

- Quis hoc dubitet? ("Who can doubt this?")
  Quaerit quis (qui) hoc dubitet/dubitare possit. ("He asks who can doubt this.")
  Quaesivit quis (qui) hoc dubitaret/dubitare posset. ("He asked who could doubt this.")
- Quis hoc dubitaret/dubita(vi)sset? ("Who could doubt/could have doubted this?")
  Quaerit quis (or: qui) hoc dubitaret/dubita(vi)sset/dubitaturus fuerit. ("He asks who could doubt/could have doubted this.")

A dependent clause in the indicative is put into the subjunctive if it is changed to indirect speech. Almost all the rules stated above hold for indirect questions:

The simple present particular conditional becomes the present indicative in the protasis and the apodosis:

- Si id credis, erras ("If you believe that, you are wrong.")
  Dicit te, si id credas, errare ("He says that if you believe that, you are wrong.")
  Dixit te, si id crederes, errare. ("He said that if you believed that, you were wrong.")

The unreal present conditional (an imperfect subjunctive in the protasis and the apodosis; an unreal imperfect subjunctive remains unchanged in the protasis; an unreal imperfect subjunctive becomes the infinitive -urum fuisse in the apodosis):

- Si id crederes, errares. ("If you believed that, you would be wrong.")
  Dicit/dixit te, si id crederes, erraturum fuisse. ("He says/said that if you believed that, you would be wrong.")

The vivid future conditional (a future perfect indicative in a protasis, a direct question with a future indicative in an apodosis; a protasis is changed to a perfect or pluperfect subjunctive, according to the rules of the sequence of tenses; an apodosis similarly is changed to an indirect question with the periphrastic -usus sim/essem):

- Cur, si id credideris, errabis? ("Why, if you believe that, will you be wrong?")
  Quaerit cur, si id credideris, erraturus sis. ("He asks why, if you believe that, you will be wrong.")
  Quaesivit cur, si id credidisses, erraturus esses. ("He asked why, if you believed that, you would be wrong.")

=== Russian ===
In Russian and many other Slavic languages, indirect speech uses the same verb tense as the equivalent sentence in direct speech:

- Я не люблю шоколад. ("I don't like chocolate")
  Она сказала, что не любит шоколад. ("She said that she didn't like chocolate", literally, "She said that (she) doesn't like chocolate")

=== Persian ===
Persian is similar to Slavic languages and indirect speech uses the same verb forms as those of direct speech:

- شکلات دوست ندارم. ("I don't like chocolate")
  گفت که شکلات دوست ندارد. ("He/She said that he/she didn't like chocolate", literally, "He/She said that he/she doesn't like chocolate")

=== German ===
German indirect speech consists formally of dependent clauses depending on a verb of saying, holding, thinking or the like, but they may sometimes be elliptically left out and simply implied. Questions take their question-word, yes-no-questions take ob ("whether"), and statements take dass for the conjunction. Also, German indirect speech must be put into subjunctive mood. That is one of the primary uses for the non-periphrastical subjunctive.

- Hans gibt an, dass er täglich Sport treibe. Darauf will Michael wissen, welche Sportart er bevorzuge. Markus hingegen interessiert sich mehr dafür, ob er dazu ein Fitness-Studio aufsuche.
  Hans states he practices sport daily. Michael consequently wants to know which kind of sports he prefers. Markus on the other hand is rather interested in [the question] whether he goes to a gym for doing so.

The conjunction "dass" can be left out. In that case, the indirect speech is put into main-clause word order (inflected verb at second place) even though it is still a dependent clause separated by a comma:

- Hans gibt an, er treibe täglich Sport.
  Hans states he practices sport daily.

In longer segments of indirect speech, which, at least in written German, are as normal as they would be in Latin, only the first sentence or none of them has a "dass", and full-stops are put wherever they would have been put in direct speech.

- Hans gibt an, dass er täglich Sport treibe. Er habe zuerst mit Dauerlauf begonnen. Mittlerweile ziehe er aber den Mannschaftssport vor. Er spiele Fußball im Verein SC Oberhügelhausen und trainiere fleißig, damit man ihn bald in die erste Mannschaft aufnehme; darauf habe er gute Chancen.
  Hans states he practices sport daily. At first he began with jogging, but now he prefers team sports. He has started to play football in the club SC Oberhügelhausen and he is training hard so that they will add him to the first team soon; he has [according to him] good chances for that.

Shorter statements of indirect speech may be presented in the indicative if they are not doubted; however, it would be colloquial to do so but to leave the "dass" out:

- Hans gibt an, dass er täglich Sport treibt.
  Hans states he practices sport daily.

Notes on the subjunctive:

1. The German subjunctive is mostly regular even if the indicative is irregular such as sein "to be". The stem of the word (infinitive minus -en or -n) is followed by -e, -est, -e, -en, et, -en. Other than in the indicative, an -e- remains even the most colloquial speech be (the few exceptions still differentiate the indicative, such as "du seist" for "du seiest").
2. If the direct speech is in the present, the present subjunctive is used. If the direct speech is the past, whether it is expressed by the perfect or by the preterite, the perfect subjunctive is used (not the imperfect subjunctive). If the direct speech is in the future, the future subjunctive is used; both of the latter are formed by adding the auxiliaries that form the perfect or future into the subjunctive.
3. If the present subjunctive is the same as the present indicative, which can often happen other than in the third person-singular, whose the regular indicative ending is a -t, the second subjunctive, also known as irrealis, Konjunktiv II, or traditionally as the imperfect subjunctive, is used. The present subjunctive is identical to the preterite in weak verbs but has the same endings as the first subjunctive, which differentiate at least the first-person and the third-person singular in strong verbs, whose indicative does not end in -e. Strong verbs usually also add an umlaut (ich zog → ich zöge) or even use an older form to form the umlaut (ich stand, older ich stund → ich stünde).
4. If the imperfect subjunctive is the same as the preterite indicative, shorter statements also use the periphrastic construction of the conjunctive for the actual irrealis (ich würde machen, etc.). However, the subjunctive can be left in place unchanged, which is almost always the case for longer segments.
5. The second subjunctive is often used even when the first subjunctive form of a verb is unambiguous. Grammarians differ whether that is ever acceptable, such as when expressing a large amount of doubt.
6. If the direct speech is in the pluperfect, the (otherwise-deprecated) "redoubled perfect" is accurate: "Er sagte, das Fußballspiel habe gestern nicht stattfinden können, weil ein Gewitter den Platz überschwemmt gehabt habe." (He said, the football match could not [lit. has not been able to] take place yesterday, because a thunderstorm had flooded [lit. has had flooded] the field.)

== See also ==
- Content clause
- Free indirect speech
- Propositional attitude
- Quotation
- Slifting
