= John R. Ross =

American poet and linguist (1938–2025)

John R. "Haj" Ross
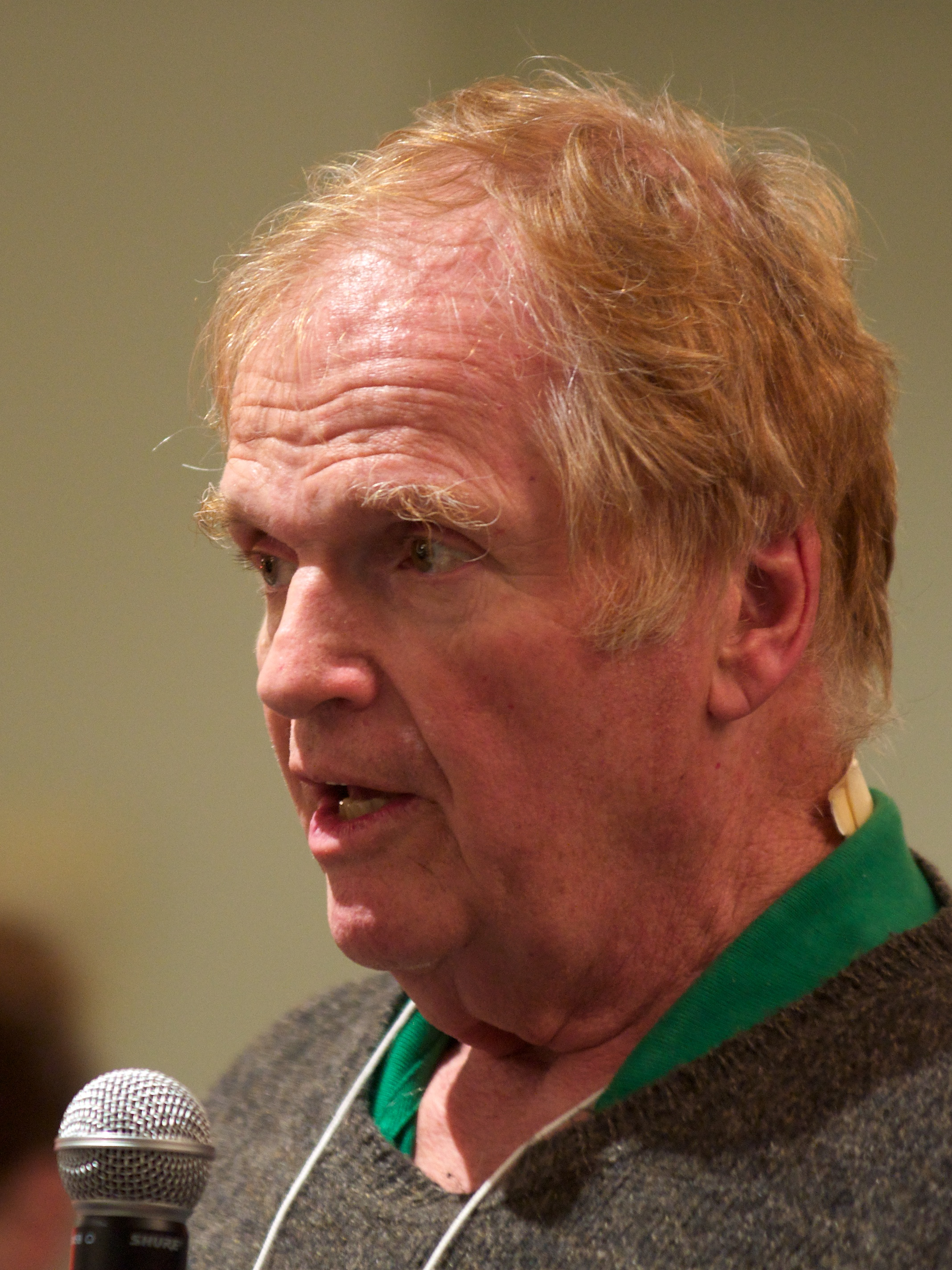
- Ross in 2011
- Born: May 7, 1938; Boston, Massachusetts, U.S.
- Died: May 13, 2025 (aged 87)
- Education: MIT (PhD); University of Pennsylvania (AM); Friedrich-Wilhelms-Universität (linguistics courses); Freie Universität (general studies courses); Yale University (AB)
- Known for: islands, pied piping, sluicing, "squib"
- Scientific career
- Fields: Syntax, Generative grammar, Generative semantics, Poetics
- Workplaces: University of North Texas, MIT
- Doctoral advisor: Noam Chomsky
- Notable students: Richard S. Kayne

John Robert "Haj" Ross (May 7, 1938 – May 13, 2025) was an American poet and linguist. He played a part in the development of generative semantics along with George Lakoff, James D. McCawley, and Paul Postal. He was a professor of linguistics at MIT from 1966 to 1985 and worked in Brazil, Singapore and British Columbia. Until spring 2021, he taught at the University of North Texas.

Ross's 1967 MIT dissertation is a landmark in syntactic theory and documents in great detail Ross's discovery of syntactic islands. He is known for naming concepts. He coined many new terms describing syntactic phenomena, including copula switch, gapping, heavy NP shift, myopia, the penthouse principle, pied piping, scrambling, siamese sentences, sluicing, slifting, and sloppy identity. In linguistics more generally, Ross popularized the use of the term squib to refer to a short scholarly article.

== Life and career ==
As a student, Ross was exposed to many influential figures within the field. Ross was a student of Bernard Bloch, Samuel Martin and Rulon Wells at Yale University; Zellig Harris, Henry Hiz, Henry Hoenigswald and Franklin Southworth at the University of Pennsylvania; and Roman Jakobson, Noam Chomsky, Morris Halle, Paul Postal, Edward Klima and Hu Matthews at MIT. Ross met Lakoff in 1963 and began collaborating with him especially on work by and influenced by Postal. He was a professor of linguistics at MIT from 1966 to 1985 and worked in Brazil, Singapore and British Columbia.

Until Spring 2021, he taught at the University of North Texas and his class offerings there included Linguistics and Literature, Syntax, Field Methods, History of English, Semantics and Pragmatics. He also oversaw U.N.T.'s Doctorate in Poetics program.

Relating to syntactic islands, he coined the terms "left-branch condition", "complex-np constraint", "coordinate structure constraint", and "sentential subject constraint". In phonology, he suggested the term conspiracy to Charles Kisseberth.

Like Roman Jakobson, Ross analyzed poetry using linguistics (see poetics and cognitive poetics).

Ross died on May 13, 2025, at the age of 87.

== Works ==
- Ross, John R. (1966), "A proposed rule of tree-pruning", Harvard Computation Laboratory Report to the National Science Foundation on Mathematical linguistics and automatic translation, Cambridge, MA: Harvard University Computation Laboratory, No. NSF-17
- Ross, John R. (1966), "Relativization in extraposed clauses", Harvard Computation Laboratory Report to the National Science Foundation on Mathematical linguistics and automatic translation, Cambridge, MA: Harvard University Computation Laboratory, No. NSF-17
- Ross, John R. (1967), Constraints on variables in syntax (Doctoral dissertation), Massachusetts Institute of Technology, hdl:1721.1/15166 (Published as Ross 1986).
- Ross, John R. (1967), "On the cyclic nature of English pronominalization", To honor Roman Jakobson: Essays on the occasion of his seventieth birthday, vol. 3, The Hague: Mouton, pp. 1669–1682, doi:10.1515/9783111349138-001, OCLC 169005
- Ross, John R. (1969), "Auxiliaries as main verbs", in Todd, W. (ed.), Studies in philosophical linguistics, Series 1, Evanston, IL: Great Expectations Press
- Ross, John R. (1980) [1970], "On declarative sentences", in Jacobs, R. A.; Rosenbaum, P. S. (eds.), Readings in English transformational grammar, Washington: Georgetown University Press, pp. 222–272, ISBN 0-87840-187-3
- Ross, John R. (1970), "Gapping and the order of constituents", in Bierwisch, M.; Heidolph, Karl E. (eds.), Progress in linguistics, The Hague: Mouton, doi:10.1515/9783111350219.249, ISBN 978-90-279-0723-3
- Ross, John R. (1972), "Act", in Davidson, Donald; Harman, Gilbert (eds.), Semantics of Natural Language, Dordrecht, Holland: D. Reidel and Company, pp. 70–126, doi:10.1007/978-94-010-2557-7_4, ISBN 978-90-277-0304-0
- Ross, John R. (1972), "The category squish: Endstation Hauptwort", in Peranteau, Paul M.; Levi, Judith N.; Phares, Gloria C. (eds.), Proceedings of the Eighth Regional Meeting of the Chicago Linguistic Society, Chicago, Illinois: Chicago Linguistic Society, pp. 316–328, ISBN 0-914203-02-9
- Ross, John R. (1972), "Doubl-ing", in Kimball, J. (ed.), Syntax and semantics, vol. 1, New York: Seminar Press, pp. 157–186, doi:10.1163/9789004372986_013, ISBN 0-12-861301-7
- Ross, John R. (1972), "A reanalysis of English word stress (part I)", in Brame, Michael K. (ed.), Contributions to generative phonology, Austin: University of Texas Press, ISBN 0-292-71001-1
- Ross, John R. (1973), "Slifting", in Gross, Maurice; Halle, Morris; Schützenberger, Marcel (eds.), The Formal Analysis of Natural Languages, 's Gravenhage, Holland: Mouton and Company, pp. 133–172, doi:10.1515/9783110885248-009, ISBN 978-90-279-2467-4
- Ross, John R. (1973), "The Penthouse Principle and the order of constituents", in Corum, Claudia; et al. (eds.), You Take the High Node and I'll Take the Low Node, Chicago, Illinois: Chicago Linguistic Society, pp. 397–422, ISBN 0-914203-03-7
- Ross, Haj (1982), "The sound of meaning", in Linguistic Society of Korea (ed.), Linguistics in the Morning Calm, Seoul, Korea: Hanshin Publishing Company, pp. 275–290, OCLC 10322413
- Ross, Haj (1984), "Inner islands", in Brugman, Claudia; Macauley, Monica; et al. (eds.), Proceedings of the Tenth Annual Meeting of the Berkeley Linguistics Society, Berkeley: Berkeley Linguistics Society, pp. 258–265, doi:10.3765/bls.v10i0.1940
- Ross, John R. (1986), Infinite syntax!, Norwood, NJ: ABLEX, ISBN 0-89391-042-2
- Ross, Haj (1995), "Defective noun phrases", in Dainora, Audra; Hemphill, Rachel; Luka, Barbara; Need, Barbara; Pargman, Sheri (eds.), Proceedings of the Thirty-First Regional Meeting of the Chicago Linguistic Society, Chicago, Illinois: Chicago Linguistic Society, pp. 398–440
- Ross, Haj (2000), "The frozenness of pseudoclefts – towards an inequality-based syntax", in Okrent, Arika; Boyle, John P. (eds.), Proceedings of the Thirty-Sixth Regional Meeting of the Chicago Linguistic Society, Chicago, Illinois: Chicago Linguistic Society, pp. 385–426
- Ross, John R. (2004), "Siamese sentences – a first look at a parallel construction", in Andronis, Mary; Debenport, Erin; Pycha, Anne; Yoshimura, Keiko (eds.), Proceedings of the Thirty-Eighth Regional Meeting of the Chicago Linguistic Society, Chicago, Illinois: Chicago Linguistic Society, pp. 569–584

=== Collaborations ===
- Cooper, William E.; Ross, John R. (1975), "Word order", in Grossman, Robin E.; et al. (eds.), Papers from the Parasession on Functionalism, Chicago, Illinois: Chicago Linguistic Society, pp. 63–111
- Lakoff, George; Ross, John R. (1966), "Criterion for verb phrase constituency", Harvard Computation Laboratory Report to the National Science Foundation on Mathematical Linguistics and Automatic Translation, Cambridge, MA: Harvard University Computation Laboratory, No. NSF-17
- Lakoff, George; Ross, John R. (1976), "Is deep structure necessary?", in McCawley, J. D. (ed.), Syntax and Semantics 7, pp. 159–164, doi:10.1163/9789004368859_011, ISBN 0-12-613507-X
