= Sequence of tenses =

Set of grammatical rules

The sequence of tenses (known in Latin as consecutio temporum, and also known as agreement of tenses, succession of tenses and tense harmony) is a set of grammatical rules of a particular language, governing the agreement between the tenses of verbs in related clauses or sentences.

A hypothetical context in which rules of sequence of tenses apply is that of indirect speech. If, at some past time, someone spoke a sentence in a particular tense (say the present tense), and that act of speaking is now being reported, the tense used in the clause that corresponds to the words spoken may or may not be the same as the tense that was used by the original speaker. In some languages the tense tends to be "shifted back", so that what was originally spoken in the present tense is reported using the past tense (since what was in the present at the time of the original sentence is in the past relative to the time of reporting). English is one of the languages in which this often occurs. For example, if someone said "I need a drink", this may be reported in the form "She said she needed a drink", with the tense of the verb need changed from present to past.

The "shifting back" of tense as described in the previous paragraph may be called backshifting or an attracted sequence of tenses. In languages and contexts where such a shift does not occur, there may be said by contrast to be a natural sequence.

== English ==
In English, an attracted sequence of tenses (backshifting) is often used in indirect speech and similar contexts. The attracted sequence can be summarized as follows: If the main verb of a sentence is in the past tense, then other verbs must also express a past viewpoint, except when a general truth is being expressed.

For example, if Batman speaks the following words:

I need a special key for the Batmobile.

the speech act may be reported using the following words:

Batman said that he needed a special key for the Batmobile.

with the present tense need replaced by the past tense needed, since the main verb of saying (said) is in the past tense. Further examples can be found at Uses of English verb forms § Indirect speech.

In some cases, though, a natural sequence of tenses is more appropriate. Here the tense of a verb in a subordinate clause is not determined by the tense of the verb in the superordinate clause, but is determined simply according to the sense of the clause taken apart from the rest of the sentence. The rule for writers following the natural sequence of tenses can be expressed as follows: imagine yourself at the point in time denoted by the main verb, and use the tense for the subordinate verb that you would have used at that time. Thus the tense used in the indirect speech remains the same as it was in the words as originally spoken. This is normal when the main verb is in the present or future tense (as opposed to past tense or conditional mood). For example:

Batman says that he needs a special key for the Batmobile. (main verb in present tense)
Batman has said that he needs a special key for the Batmobile. (main verb in present perfect, not past tense, so no backshifting)

However it is also possible to use the natural sequence even if the main verb is past or conditional:

Batman said that he needs a special key for the Batmobile.

This option is more likely to be used when the circumstance being expressed remains equally true now as it did when the speech act took place, and especially if the person reporting the words agrees that they are true or valid.

Debate amongst grammarians over the appropriateness of the two types of sequence of tenses goes back as far as the 18th century. Use of the attracted sequence sometimes leads to additional problems when the grammatical construction of indirect speech includes an incorporated quotation – that is, when an attempt is made (though using indirect rather than direct speech) to report the words actually spoken. For example, if a minister spoke the words "Such a policy is not without its drawbacks", then a writer may attempt to report this as follows:

The minister admitted that "such a policy is not without its drawbacks".

using quotation marks to denote that that portion of the sentence represents the minister's actual words. This, however, requires use of the natural sequence of tenses, which might not be felt appropriate in the given situation. There are various possible solutions to this problem:

- Rearrange the sentence so that the incorporated quotations become set off, possibly as direct speech:

The minister did not claim perfection: "such a policy is not without its drawbacks", he admitted.

- Cut down the incorporated quotation to exclude the verb:

The minister admitted that such a policy was "not without its drawbacks".

- Use square brackets to indicate where the words deviate from those actually spoken:

The minister admitted that "such a policy [was] not without its drawbacks".

Similar problems arise from the other changes that typically occur in indirect speech, such as changes of pronoun (depending on speaker).

For more details, see the article on indirect speech, and also the article on uses of English verb forms, particularly the sections on indirect speech and dependent clauses.

== Russian ==
Indirect speech in Russian and other Slavic languages generally uses the natural sequence of tenses (there is no backshifting). For examples, see Indirect speech § Russian.

== Latin ==
In Latin, the sequence of tenses rule affects dependent verbs in the subjunctive mood, mainly in indirect questions, indirect commands, and purpose clauses. If the main verb is in one of the non-past tenses, the subordinate verb is usually in the present or perfect subjunctive (primary sequence); if the main verb is in one of the past tenses, the subordinate verb is usually in the imperfect or pluperfect subjunctive (historic sequence). For example, when the subordinate verb refers to a time contemporaneous or later than the time of the main verb, the present or imperfect subjunctive is used:

quaerit ubi sit (present subjunctive)
'he asks where it is'

quaesivit ubi esset (imperfect subjunctive)
'he asked where it was'

When the subordinate verb refers to a time earlier than that of the main verb, the perfect or pluperfect subjunctive is used:

nescio quid fecerit (perfect subjunctive)
'I don't know what he did/has done/was doing'

nesciebam quid fecisset (pluperfect subjunctive)
'I didn't know what he had done/had been doing'

If the main verb is a historic present (i.e. a present tense with a past meaning), either primary or historic sequence may be used, or in a long sentence even a mixture of the two:

legatos mittunt qui pacem petant/peterent (present or imperfect subjunctive)
'they send (i.e. sent) ambassadors to ask for peace'

If the main verb is a perfect tense, it is usually followed by the historic sequence, but if the meaning is equivalent to an English present perfect (i.e. "have done"), it may be followed by primary sequence:

me praemisit haec ut nuntiem (present subjunctive)
'he has sent me ahead to announce these things'

There are frequent exceptions to the sequence of tenses rule (see Latin tenses#Sequence of tenses rule). For example, verbs in conditional clauses do not usually follow the rule:

dic quid facturus fueris si censor fuisses? (perfect subjunctive + pluperfect subjunctive)
'tell us what you would have done if you had been censor'

Consecutive clauses also do not always follow the rule:

Siciliam ita vexavit ut restitui non possit (present subjunctive)
'he harassed Sicily so much (during his governorship) that it cannot be restored'

When the sentence is an indirect statement (which uses the accusative and infinitive construction in Latin), the main verb of the reported sentence is an infinitive which remains unchanged, no matter what the tense of the main verb. The present infinitive is used for a situation contemporaneous with the main verb:

dicit hostes adesse (present infinitive)
'he says the enemy are present'

dixit hostes adesse (present infinitive)
'he said the enemy were present'

The perfect infinitive is used for an event or situation earlier than the time of the main verb:

dicit Caesarem venisse (perfect infinitive)
'he says that Caesar has come'

dixit Caesarem venisse (perfect infinitive)
'he said that Caesar had come'

However, subordinate clauses in an indirect statement use the subjunctive mood, which is subject to the sequence of tenses rule:

locum ubi esset facile inventūrōs (Nepos)
'(he said) they would easily find the place where he was'

== Greek ==
In Classical Greek, the tenses in subordinate clauses must correspond to those in the superordinate clauses governing them.

A principal tense (present tense, future tense, or perfect tense) in the superordinate clause is followed by a principal tense in the indicative mood or subjunctive mood. Such a principal tense is followed by:

- the present tense when the action of the subordinate verb refers to the same time as the superordinate verb
- the perfect when the action of the subordinate verb has been completed before the time of the superordinate verb
- the future tense when the action of the subordinate verb is in the future of the time of the superordinate verb

A historical tense (imperfect, pluperfect, or aorist) in the superordinate clause is followed by a historical tense in the indicative mood or optative mood. Such a historic tense is followed by:

- the imperfect when the action of the subordinate verb refers to the same time as the superordinate verb
- the pluperfect when the action of the subordinate verb has been completed before the time of the superordinate verb
- the aorist
- the future tense in the optative mood when the action of the subordinate verb is in the future of the time of the superordinate verb.

== Italian ==
The set of rules comprising the sequence of tenses (and modes of the main and subordinate clauses) in the Italian language corresponds in general to the "consecutio temporum" of the Latin grammar.

To determine the form of the verb in the subordinate clause it is necessary to know:

1. if the verb in the main clause is in the indicative or subjunctive mood,
2. if the verb in the main clause is in the present or past tense, and
3. if the verb in the subordinate clause expresses an action which unfolds before, at the same time, or after the action indicated in the main clause.

The various combinations are summarized in four tables (see below).

=== Sequence of tenses of the indicative ===
==== The verb of the main clause is in the present tense ====
Main clause	Subordinate clause	Temporal relationship
Luisa sa (present)	che ieri sono andato a Roma (present perfect)	anteriority
Luisa sa (present)	che adesso vado a Roma (present)	contemporaneity
Luisa sa (present)	che domani andrò a Roma (simple future)	posteriority

==== The verb of the main clause is a past tense ====
If the verb of the main clause is in the past (simple past, imperfect, or past perfect), the verbal forms of the subordinate clause refer to the moment indicated in the main clause and adapt accordingly. The present in the subordinate clase will transform to imperfect, the past will become past perfect, etc.:

Main clause	Subordinate clause	Temporal relationship
Luisa sapeva (imperfect)	che ero andato a Roma (past perfect)	anteriority
Luisa sapeva (imperfect)	che andavo a Roma (imperfect)	contemporaneity
Luisa sapeva (imperfect)	che sarei andato a Roma (conditional perfect)	posteriority

=== Sequence of tenses of the subjunctive ===
Despite the use of the subjunctive, the verbal tenses follow rules similar to those of the Indicative mood. The Present Indicative of the subordinate clause will be substituted with the subjunctive present; similarly, the present perfect will be substituted with its correspondent form, that of the past subjunctive and the Past perfect tense with the subjunctive past perfect.

==== The verb of the main clause is in the present tense ====
Main clause	Subordinate clause	Temporal relationship
Luisa pensa (present)	che io sia andato a Roma (past subjunctive)	anteriority
Luisa pensa (present)	che io vada a Roma (present subjunctive)	contemporaneity
Luisa pensa (present)	che andrò a Roma (simple future)	posteriority

==== The verb of the main clause is a past tense ====
If the verb of the main clause is in the past tense, the verbal forms of the subordinate will be adapted to that of the main clause:

Main clause	Subordinate clause	Temporal relationship
Luisa pensava (imperfect)	che fossi andato a Roma (past perfect subjunctive)	anteriority
Luisa pensava (imperfect)	che andassi a Roma (subjunctive imperfect)	contemporaneity
Luisa pensava (imperfect)	che sarei andato a Roma (past conditional)	posteriority
