= Ignacy Łempicki (diplomat) =

Polish diplomat and military officer

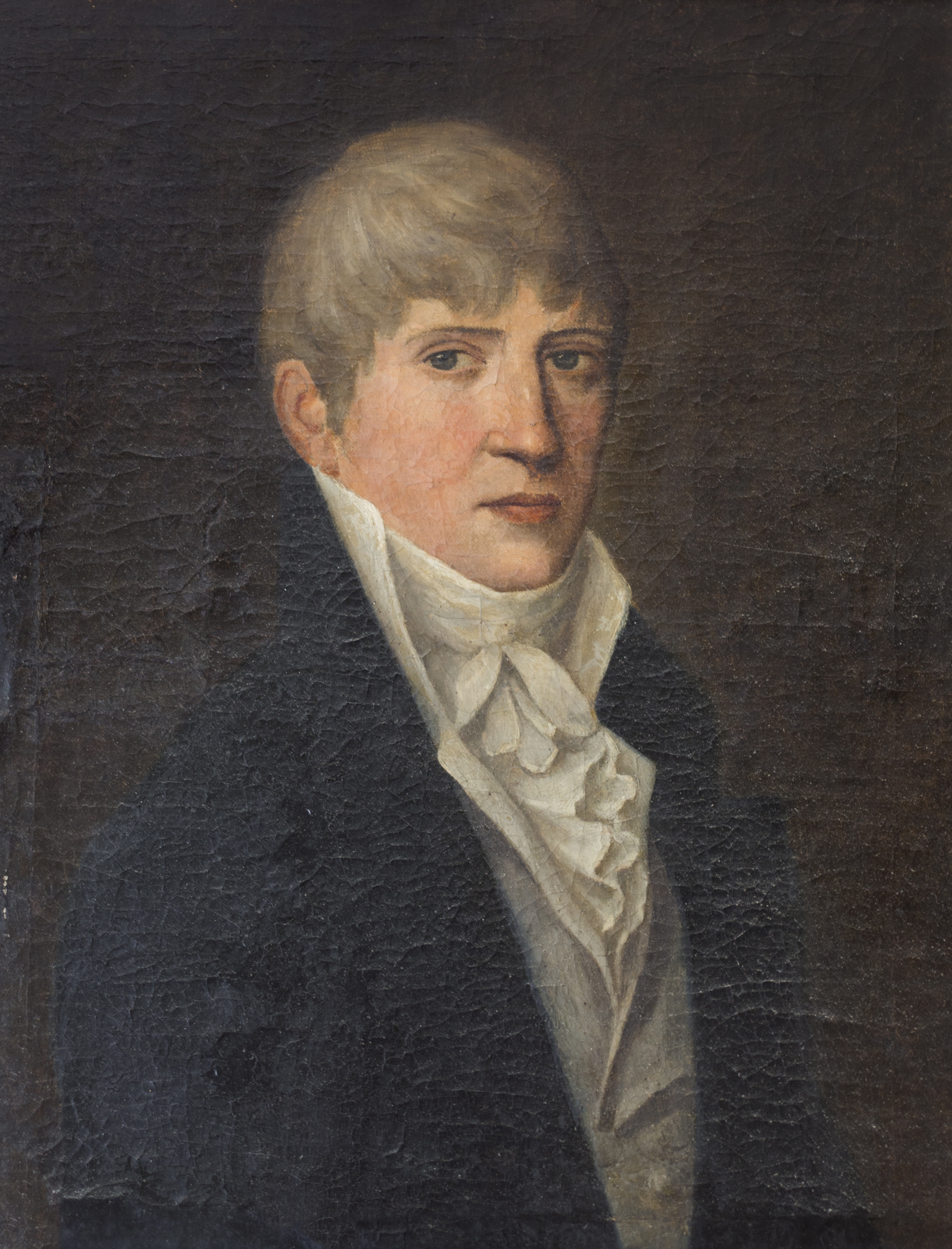

- Coat of arms: Junosza
- Born: 1766; Warsaw
- Died: after 1804
- Family: Łempicki
- Consort: Aleksandra Olszewska
- Issue: Marianna Łempicka
- Father: Ignacy Łempicki
- Mother: Marianna Hiż

Ignacy Łempicki (1766 – after 1804) was a Polish diplomat and military officer, Poland's chargé d'affaires in Vienna between 1793 and 1795.

== Biography ==
He was the son of Ignacy Czesław Łempicki, General of Poland's Crown Army, and Marianna Hiż; grandson of Jan Wilhelm Hiż, a colonel of the Crown Guard; nephew of Jan August Hiż, Major General of the Kingdom of Poland; and cousin of Jan Hiż. He had a sister Eufemia.

In the years 1776–1787 he studied at the Corps of Cadets in Warsaw. In 1786 he became a chorąży of the Army of the Polish Crown.

Most likely, in 1789 he went to Vienna together with the former Vice-Commandant of the Corps of Cadets Franciszek Woyna (who took the diplomatic mission in Vienna at the time) as his secretary. In 1791, Ignacy Łempicki was an adjutant at the office of the Polish embassy in Vienna. After Woyna's resignation in July 1793, he took the position of chargé d’affaires.

During the Kościuszko Uprising in 1794, the Viennese office he directed sent the largest number of reports to the Foreign Interest Department of the Supreme National Council. After the fall of the uprising, Łempicki remained at the disposal of the king Stanisław August, who in February 1795 called him to return to the country. Remaining unpaid for months, Łempicki could not leave Vienna because of debt. It was not until November 25, 1795, that Stanisław August sent him almost a thousand ducats along with a circular letter, finally liquidating the Polish foreign service.

Łempicki settled in Galicia, where he was the heir to Poraż in the Liski poviat, and in 1805 he proved himself noble at the Department of the Galicia Estates. He was married to Aleksandra Olszewska. He had a daughter Maria (Marianna), the wife of Teofil Romer, (Note: Teofil Romer (1814–1894) was a nobleman from Galicia, sentenced for participating in the Krakow Uprising (1846) to twelve years in prison; he served his sentence in the fortress Špilberk; in the years 1858–1870 a leaseholder and administrator of the village of Bieszczady Rajskie.) grandmother of general Franciszek Latinik.
