= Tadeusz Hiż =

Polish poet, journalist and translator (1883–1945)

- Born: 27 April 1883; Warsaw, Congress Poland
- Died: 31 December 1945 (aged 62); Kraków, Poland
- Citizenship: Poland
- Occupations: Poet, journalist, translator

Tadeusz Leon Hiż (27 April 1883 – 31 December 1945) was a Polish poet, journalist and translator.

== Biography ==
He was the son of Tomasz Hiż (1848−1922) and Leontyna née Kucz (1850−1920); grandson of Karol Kucz and Józef Hiż; great-grandson of Jan August Hiż.

As a child, he moved with his parents to Saint Petersburg, where his father held a position in the Russian syndicate "Prodameta" (Prodaza metalov). There, Tadeusz Hiż graduated from high school. In 1902, he entered the Law Faculty of Saint Petersburg University. He participated in Polish youth life, serving as a board member and host of the Polish student kitchen in Saint Petersburg. He was arrested for organizing a rally in 1907.

His texts appeared, among others, in Gazeta Polska.

In 1915 he married Emilia Hiż née Elżanowska; their sons were Stanisław Hiż and Henryk Hiż.

His remaining were buried at the Rakowicki Cemetery on 3 January 1946.

== Works ==
- Wybór wierszy. Warsaw. 1908.
- Sen o skrzydłach. Wiersze i sceny. Saint Petersburg. 1914.
- Kościuszko. Saint Petersburg. 1917.
- Hejnał. Warsaw. 1934.
- Talent, dziwactwo i coś jeszcze. Warsaw. 1937.
