= Henryk Hiż =

Polish analytic philosopher (1917–2006)

- Born: 8 October 1917; Petrograd, Russian Republic
- Died: 19 December 2006 (aged 89); Cape May Point, New Jersey, U.S.
- Education: Université libre de Bruxelles (licence en philosophie, 1946); Harvard University (Ph.D., 1948)
- Scientific career
- Fields: Mathematics, logic, formal language
- Institutions: University of Warsaw (1949); University of Łódź (1950); New York University (1950–1951); University of Utah (1951–1953); Pennsylvania State University (1954–1960); University of Pennsylvania (1960–1988); Columbia University (1973–1976); University of Cambridge (1976–1977); Jagiellonian University (1976–1977); University of Warsaw (1991–1992)
- Thesis: (1948)
- Doctoral advisor: W.V.O. Quine

Henryk Hiż (Polish: [xiʂ]; 8 October 1917 – 19 December 2006) was a Polish analytical philosopher specializing in linguistics, philosophy of language, logic, mathematics and ethics, active for most of his life in the United States, one of the youngest representatives of the Lwów–Warsaw school.

A disciple of Tadeusz Kotarbiński, Hiż studied at the University of Warsaw. During the German occupation of Poland in World War II, he participated in the Polish resistance movement as a cryptographer in the Home Army. In 1944 he took part in the Warsaw Uprising. In 1948, he defended his Ph.D. at Harvard University under W.V.O. Quine.

In 1950, he permanently emigrated to the United States. He kept in touch with the American logical environment, including with Alfred Tarski, and maintained lively contact with the Polish academic community. He lectured at the University of Pennsylvania between 1960 and 1988. In 1976 he was a Guggenheim Fellow and a visiting fellow at the University of Cambridge. In 1982 he received the Alfred Jurzykowski Foundation Award. He was a member of the Warsaw Scientific Society.

He published about one hundred original papers in peer-reviewed scientific journals. Strongly influenced by the Lwów–Warsaw school, initially in his research he was interested in semantics, formal logic and methodology of the sciences. From the late 1950s, he dealt mainly with linguistics in relation to logic and philosophy. He described himself as a naturalist and linguistic behaviorist, assuming that the linguistic work is primarily about linguistic behavior. He called himself a “negative utilitarian”; and was also a pacifist and an atheist.

== Biography ==
=== Early life and German occupation ===
He was born on October 8, 1917, in Petrograd as the son of Tadeusz Hiż and Emilia née Elżanowska. He had an older brother, Stanisław Hiż (1915–1999). In 1920, the family came to Poland, settling in Warsaw. Henryk's mother, Emilia, was an architect, while his father Tadeusz Hiż was a journalist, who kept in touch with the Warsaw's bohemian circles. Franciszek Fiszer was, among others, a frequent guest in their house. Years later, Henryk Hiż said that “he obtained a lot from his parental home”.

He attended the Mikołaj Rej High School in Warsaw, where he passed the matriculation examination in 1937. For two years he was an actor at the School Theater of the Reduta Institute. In 1938, he performed in the play Kościuszko near Racławice (Kościuszko pod Racławicami) directed by Maria Dulęba, portraying historical figure Bartosz Głowacki. In the theater, he also met Ewa Kunina, Juliusz Osterwa and Iwo Gall. In the late 1930s he associated with the so-called “democratic youth”, becoming one of the founding members of the anti-fascist Democratic Club in Warsaw.

In 1937 he enrolled at the University of Warsaw to study philosophy. He attended lectures and seminars in logic led by Jan Łukasiewicz, Stanisław Leśniewski and Alfred Tarski. He was most influenced by Tadeusz Kotarbiński, to which he later referred as his master. After the establishment of the ghetto benches at the university, Hiż together with a group of students used to stand against the wall instead of sitting during the lectures, to manifest their opposition to the antisemitic attitude of most of the then-academic staff and co-students.

After the outbreak of World War II, during the German occupation of Poland, Hiż continued his education in the underground university until 1944. At the time, he was appointed an assistant to Kotarbiński and Łukasiewicz, and ran the classes in their absence. In the wartime he made friends with Jerzy Pelc, Klemens Szaniawski, Jan Strzelecki, Andrzej Grzegorczyk and Krzysztof Kamil Baczyński.

Although he was a pacifist from a young age, and he was to say that he would not be able to use a gun even in self-defense, he joined the Home Army and became active in the Polish resistance movement. Later he justified that “a few roundups morally or nervously forced him to” do that. He worked in the Home Army's General Command, in the ciphers department. Mathematician Stefan Mazurkiewicz taught him encryption. In 1943 Henryk Hiż married Danuta Wicentowicz. In 1944 he took part in the Warsaw Uprising, in the rank of second lieutenant (podporucznik). After the fall of the uprising, he was taken prisoner by Nazi Germany and carried to an oflag in Lübeck, where he stayed until the liberation of the Allies. He considered the decision of Polish military command to start an uprising “unwise”.

=== Studies in Belgium and the U.S., short return to Poland ===
After the liberation, he enrolled in philosophy at the Université libre de Bruxelles, where he and his wife studied under Chaïm Perelman and Eugène Dupréel. In 1946 they obtained master's degrees (license en philosophie). In the same year, Henryk and Danuta Hiż left for the United States, along with the post-war wave of Eastern European emigrants and refugees.

In 1948, Hiż defended his Ph.D. at Harvard University under Willard Van Orman Quine. In the years 1948–1949 he was a lecturer and tutor at Harvard. There he met Clarence I. Lewis, Percy W. Bridgman and Philipp Frank.

He returned to Poland, where between 1949 and 1950 he was an adjunct at the Faculty of Mathematics of the University of Warsaw, in the Department of Philosophy of Mathematics headed by Andrzej Mostowski. In the spring of 1950 he lectured at the University of Łódź, rector of which was Tadeusz Kotarbiński. He was friends with Stanisław Ossowski and Maria Ossowska. “A short attempt to settle in the country after the war ended with disappointment”, also due to the “Stalinist course slowly starting to dominate” at the time. In 1950 Henryk Hiż left with his wife back to the U.S.

=== Permanent emigration to the United States ===
Between 1950 and 1951 he was a lecturer at Brooklyn College at New York University and at the University of Pennsylvania in Philadelphia. In the years 1951–1953 he was an assistant professor of philosophy of mathematics at the University of Utah. In 1953–1954 he returned to work at the University of Pennsylvania, where he lectured in philosophy. In 1954–1960 he was an assistant professor and associate professor of mathematics at Pennsylvania State University.

In 1962, Henryk Hiż and his wife obtained American citizenship. From 1960, Hiż was an associate professor, and between 1964 and 1988 he was a full professor of linguistics at the University of Pennsylvania. In the years 1958–1981 he was the Deputy Head of the research group on transformation and text analysis, subsidized by the National Science Foundation. Occasionally, he was also a member of the Faculty of Computer Science and the Faculty of Philosophy of the University of Pennsylvania. He kept in touch with Alfred Tarski, who helped Hiż get employment in the U.S. In Philadelphia, Hiż made a close acquaintance with philosopher Charles H. Kahn, who dedicated his book The Verb “be” in Ancient Greek to Henryk and Danuta Hiż.

In 1966, Hiż was a lecturer at the Tate Institute for Advanced Study in Mumbai. In 1968–1971 he was a visiting professor of philosophy at New York University. In 1973–1976 he was a lecturer in philosophy at Columbia University. Between 1976 and 1977 he was a Guggenheim Fellow and visiting fellow at Clare Hall at the University of Cambridge. In 1976, he was the President of the Semiotic Society of America.

In 1988 he retired and has since worked as a retired professor of linguistics. He lectured in the fall semester of 1988 and spring of 1990.

Hiż “never lost contact with the Polish scientific community and was keenly interested in the situation in his home country”. In the U.S., his home was “always welcoming guests from Poland”. He was active in the Polish Institute of Arts and Sciences of America. In 1976–1977 he was a visiting professor of philosophy at the Jagiellonian University. In 1991 he was elected a member of the Warsaw Scientific Society. In the years 1991–1992 he was a visiting professor of philosophy at the University of Warsaw. In 1995 he took part in the 6th Polish Philosophical Congress in Toruń, where he gave a lecture on reasoning in the Polish language. In 2001 he presented a paper at the Tarski Centenary conference in Warsaw.

He died on December 19, 2006, at Cape May Point and was buried at the Rakowicki Cemetery in Kraków, in the family tomb (LX headquarters, southern row, place 23).

== Work and thought ==
He specialized in logic and theoretical linguistics. Jan Woleński called him “an outstanding representative of Polish and American analytical philosophy”, “the youngest disciple of the Lwów–Warsaw school”, whose death resulted in the “real end” of this school.

Hiż did not publish any book, but he authored about a hundred original papers, including in The Journal of Philosophy, The Journal of Symbolic Logic, Methods, Philosophy and Phenomenological Research, The Monist, Synthese, The Philosophical Forum and Studia Logica.

At the beginning of his career, he was interested in issues specific to the Lwów–Warsaw school: semantics, formal logic and methodology of the sciences. During this period, he appealed mostly to the philosophy of nominalism of Stanisław Leśniewski and reism of Tadeusz Kotarbiński. Kotarbiński had the greatest impact on the formation of his views (in particular with his work Elements of the Theory of Knowledge, Formal Logic and Methodology of the Sciences, 1929). With time, especially under the influence of American philosophers, Hiż began to abandon the absolutism of his professors in favor of pragmatism and pluralistic eclecticism.

From the late 1950s, “he mainly dealt with linguistics and its logical and philosophical foundations”, focusing his research program on the grammar theory of natural language. He “aimed to give a clear form to the grammar of colloquial speech”. In this way, he went beyond the interests of the Lwów–Warsaw school, claiming that it is possible and necessary to “develop formal logic so that it applies to natural language”, although “he did not postulate the full formalization of the language and its theory”.

His work was maintained in the canon of scientist naturalism. Zellig Harris, who he met in 1951 at the University of Pennsylvania, and whom he considered the main creator of formal grammar, had the greatest influence on him in linguistics. Hiż did not share Noam Chomsky's mentalism and nativism, while “recognizing the importance of the concept of linguistic competence”. Under the influence of Leonard Bloomfield and W.V.O. Quine he adopted the foundations of linguistic behaviorism, according to which the subject of the linguist's work is not mental processes, but language behaviors. He used the terminology introduced by Rudolf Carnap, although he consistently used the term sentence instead of proposition to designate the basic unit of logical examination (which revealed his ties with the Lwów–Warsaw school). He treated language as a set of sentences on which transformations operate; while language comprehension was considered closely related to the understanding of a sentence in the context of the system of other sentences.

In ethics, he advocated negative utilitarianism, recommending “taking care not of good for as many people as possible, but of reducing evil equally to every human being”. He was a pacifist and a tough critic of all forms of racism.

As a “radical atheist”, “he believed that religious faith was a manifestation of irrationalism” and “saw no way to reconcile religion with science”. However, following the view of Kotarbiński, he believed that atheism should be distinguished as part of the worldview from “godlessness, or mocking religion, or eliminating it by force”, and was “as far as possible from imposing a secular worldview on other people”.

In a number of his works he referred to the works of Polish philosophers, first of all Kotarbiński, but also Stanisław Leśniewski and Leon Chwistek. In 2013, a selection of his writings made by Jan Woleński and Barbara Stanosz, translated in Polish by Barbara Stanosz, was published posthumously.

== Awards ==
- Guggenheim Fellowship (1976)
- Alfred Jurzykowski Foundation Award (1982)

== Commemoration ==
In 1992, on the occasion of the seventy-fifth anniversary of his birth, disciples and friends of Henryk Hiż contributed to the book Philosophical Excerpts (Fragmenty filozoficzne ofiarowane Henrykowi Hiżowi w siedemdziesiątą piątą rocznicę urodzin), edited by Jerzy Pelc.

In 2010, the Polish Semiotics Society established the Henryk and Danuta Hiż Award as “an individual cash prize awarded in a competition for the best work on language philosophy and sign theory”. The Prize Fund is financial resources offered by Henryk and Danuta Hiż to a befriended Polish marriage, who then transferred the funds to the Polish Semiotic Society.
