= Ivan Merdak =

Ukrainian woodcarving master, painter and graphic artist (1933–2007)

- Іван Григорович Мердак
- Born: 26 November 1933; Rajskie, now Lesko County, Rzeszów Voivodeship, Poland
- Died: 27 May 2007 (aged 73); Kherson, Ukraine
- Education: Chernivtsi Art and Crafts School
- Occupations: Woodcarving master, painter and graphic artist

Ivan Hryhorovych Merdak (Ukrainian: Іван Григорович Мердак; 26 November 1933 – 27 May 2007) was a Ukrainian woodcarving master, painter and graphic artist. From 1973, he has been a member of the National Union of Artists of Ukraine. He was the father of S. Merdak.

== Biography ==
Ivan Merdak was born on 26 November 26, 1933, in Rajskie, now Lesko County, Rzeszów Voivodeship, Poland.

In 1946, during Operation Vistula, he was deported to the Ternopil Oblast. In 1955, he graduated from the Chernivtsi Art and Crafts School (his teacher was V. Kurov). From 1955 to 1959, he worked at the architectural workshop of Kryvbasrudobud (Dnipropetrovsk Oblast). In 1963, he started working as a designer in Berdychiv, Zhytomyr Oblast.

From 1965, he lived in Ternopil, where he worked at the art workshop of the National Union of Artists of Ukraine from 1978 to 2000. From 2005, he lived in Kherson, where he died on 27 May 2007.

== Creativity ==
In 1955, he began presenting his works at regional and national exhibitions. His solo exhibitions took place in Ternopil (1967, 1972, 1974, 1979, 1985, 1988, 1991, 1993–1994), Lviv (1981), Kyiv (1982), Ivano-Frankivsk (1983–1985), Berezhany (1990), and Kherson (2003). The artist's works include portraits dedicated to historical figures, writers, folk heroes, folklore characters (in root plastics — mavkas, leshy), and decorative plates. Some of his works are kept in the collections of the Taras Shevchenko National Museum (Kyiv), the Ternopil and Chernivtsi Museums of Local Lore, and the Ternopil and Ivano-Frankivsk Art Museums. His sculptures have been installed in Germany, Great Britain, and Sweden.

Among his important works are:

- Carvings: "Brother for Brother" (1955), "Worker" (1967), "Oleksa Dovbush" (1970), "Ustym Karmaliuk", "Zakhar Berkut" (both 1972), "Lesya Ukrainka," "Cossack Mamai," "Podolianochka" (all 1974), "My Thoughts, My Thoughts (Taras Shevchenko)", "Motherhood" (both 1975), "Ivan Vyshenskyi", "Nestor the Chronicler" (both 1978), "Yaroslav the Wise", "Mykola Hohol", "Lemko", "Lemkynia" (all 1980), "Mavka" (1981), "Danylo Halytsky", "Taras Bulba" (both 1982), "Prince Volodymyr" (1983; 1987), "Prince Vasylko of Terebovlia" (1984), "Juliusz Słowacki" (1985), "Princess Olha" (1986), "Poplar" (1991), "The Forest Song" (1993), "Grandpa Dmytro (Violin)", "Hryhorii Skovoroda", "Jesus" (all 1997), "Lemko" (1999);
- Paintings: "Native Home" (1982), "Jesus", "Graves of Ancestors" (both 1991);
- Graphic art: "Lemko Village", "Horses of Childhood" (both 1993);
- "My Ancestors" series (1990–2000).

== Awards ==
- Honored Master of Folk Art of the Ukrainian SSR (1989).
- Bronze Medal of the VDNG (1982).

== Bibliography ==
- Мердак Іван Григорович // Шевченківська енциклопедія: — Т.4:М—Па : у 6 т. / Гол. ред. М. Г. Жулинський. — Київ : Ін-т літератури ім. Т. Г. Шевченка, 2013. — С. 174-175.
- Петро Сорока. «Дух і форма, або Іван Мердак. Мистецький силует». Тернопіль: Навчальна книга-Богдан, 2005. 125 с. ISBN 978-966-10-1459-5.
