= Jan Wilhelm Hiż =

Colonel of Poland's Crown Guard

- Coat of arms: Jeż
- Family: Hiż
- Consort: Katarzyna de Mathy
- Issue: Marianna, Anna, Jan August, Antoni, Józef, Franciszek
- Father: Jan Wilhelm Hiż
- Mother: Franciszka de Loupi

Jan Wilhelm Hiż (18th century) was a Polish military officer, colonel of the Crown Guard (Gwardia koronna).

== Biography ==
He was the son of Wilhelm Hiż, the secretary in the office managing royal goods (kamera) of kings Jan III Sobieski, August II and August III; and Franciszka de Loupi; grandson of Jan Hiż, a treasurer in the service of Maria Kazimiera Sobieska.

He had several siblings, some of whom also became military: Franciszek Hiż, a colonel of the Crown Guard; Piotr Hiż, captain of engineers; Józef Hiż, Warsaw canon; and Wilhelm Hiż, Oberstleutant of the Crown Guard.

In 1764, Jan Wilhelm Hiż was among five members of the Hiż family that received nobility with the Jeż coat of arms. He was an officer in the Crown Guard, where he was promoted to the rank of colonel.

He was married to Katarzyna de Mathy, with whom he had two daughters: Marianna Hiż (married to Ignacy Łempicki, general of the Crown Army), Anna Hiż (married to Kacper Dąbkowski, colonel in the Sułkowski regiment), and four sons: Jan August Hiż, major general of the Crown Army and a colonel of the Crown Guard; Antoni Hiż, captain of the Lithuanian infantry guard; Józef Hiż, regent of the Crown Treasury Committee, childless; Franciszek Hiż, General adjutant of the Military Commission of the Polish-Lithuanian Commonwealth, also childless.
