= Penthouse principle =

Term in syntax

The penthouse principle, a term in syntax coined by John R. Ross in 1973, describes the fact that many syntactic phenomena treat matrix clauses differently from embedded (or subordinate) clauses:

The penthouse principle: The rules are different if you live in the penthouse.

The penthouse named in the principle is the top floor of a high-rise apartment building, and is a metaphor for the matrix clause in a multi-clause structure (which, when diagrammed in usual phrase marker notation, contains the highest clause node in the structure). Perhaps the best-known example of a penthouse principle effect is the distribution of subject-auxiliary inversion in constituent questions in English, which in many (but not all) varieties of English is restricted to matrix clauses:

(1) a. What can Sam do about it?

b. I'll find out what Sam can do about it.

Compare:

(2) a. *What Sam can do about it?

b. *I'll find out what can Sam do about it.

Other phenomena falling under the penthouse principle are V2-effects in the Germanic languages and the distribution of declarative markers, imperative morphology, and of various particles in a variety of languages.

== Bibliography ==
- de Haan, German (2001). "More is going on upstairs than downstairs: Embedded root phenomena in West Frisian". The Journal of Comparative Germanic Linguistics. 4 (1): 3–38. doi:10.1023/A:1012224020604.
- Merchant, Jason (2007). Three kinds of ellipsis (PDF) (Ms. thesis). University of Chicago. Archived from the original (PDF) on August 30, 2008.
- Ross, John R. (1973). "The penthouse principle and the order of constituents". In Corum, C. T.; Smith-Stark, T. C.; Weiser, A. (eds.). You Take the High Node and I'll Take the Low Node. Chicago: Chicago Linguistic Society. pp. 397–422. OCLC 705105.
