= Content clause =

Clause elaborated by a main clause

In grammar, a content clause is a dependent clause that provides content implied or commented upon by an independent clause. The term was coined by Danish linguist Otto Jespersen. Content clauses have also traditionally been called noun clauses or nominal clauses, but current linguistics tends to view those names as misnomers and prefers content clause.

== English ==
In English, there are two main kinds of content clauses: declarative content clauses (or that-clauses), which correspond to declarative sentences, and interrogative content clauses, which correspond to interrogative sentences.

=== Declarative content clauses ===
Declarative content clauses can have a number of different grammatical roles. They often serve as direct objects of verbs of reporting, cognition, perception, and so on. In this use, the conjunction that may head the clause, but is often omitted:

- He told her (that) she was smart.
- She thought (that) he was friendly.
- I hear (that) they've started dating.
- They wish (that) they had met earlier.

Similarly with certain verb-like adjectives:

- I'm not sure (that) he was right.
- Convinced (that) he could manage it without help, he decided to proceed.

They also often serve as complements of nouns—both nouns corresponding to the above verbs, and nouns like fact, idea, and so on. Here, that is almost always included:

- ... our hope that someday the whole world will know peace ...
- ... the fact that all matter obeys the same physical laws ...
- ... the idea that a son would do such a thing to his father ...

Finally, they can serve as subjects, as complements of predicative adjectives in clauses with linking verbs or in small clauses or as object complements. In this latter use, they are commonly postponed to the end of their main clause, with an expletive it standing in their original place as subject:

- It startled me that the students were so advanced.
- It is important that we remember this day.
- I find it sad that he doesn't know the answer.
- It annoys me that she does that.

Here as before, a conjunction is almost always included, although it does not need to be that:

- I like (it) when she comes to visit.
- It bothers me how she doesn't care what he wants.

=== Interrogative content clauses ===
Interrogative content clauses, often called indirect questions, can be used in many of the same ways as declarative ones; for example, they are often direct objects of verbs of cognition, reporting, and perception, but here they emphasize knowledge or lack of knowledge of one element of a fact:

- I know what you did.
- I can't guess how he managed it.
- I wonder whether I looked that bad.
- She asked where the files were.

Such clauses correspond to direct questions, which are questions actually asked. The direct questions corresponding to the examples above are What did you do? How did he manage it? Did I look that bad? Where are the files? Notice how, in English (and in some other languages), different syntax is used in direct and indirect questions: direct questions normally use subject-verb inversion, while indirect questions do not. Reported questions (as in the last of the examples) are also subject to the tense and other changes that apply generally in indirect speech. For more information see interrogative mood and English grammar.

Indirect questions can serve as adjective and noun complements. Here, in English, they are generally introduced by a preposition, especially of:

- … the question (of) who was responsible …
- … his curiosity over how it happened …
- … sure of what he had seen …

Like declarative content clauses, they are often postponed to the end of their main clause, with an expletive it standing in their original place, when they serve as the subject of a verb, or as the direct object of a verb that links them to a predicative:

- It is not known where they came from.
- I find it encouraging how many young women are pursuing careers in science.

== See also ==
- Direct discourse
- Embedded clause
- Propositional attitude
- Quotation
- Slifting
