= Rajskie =

- Village
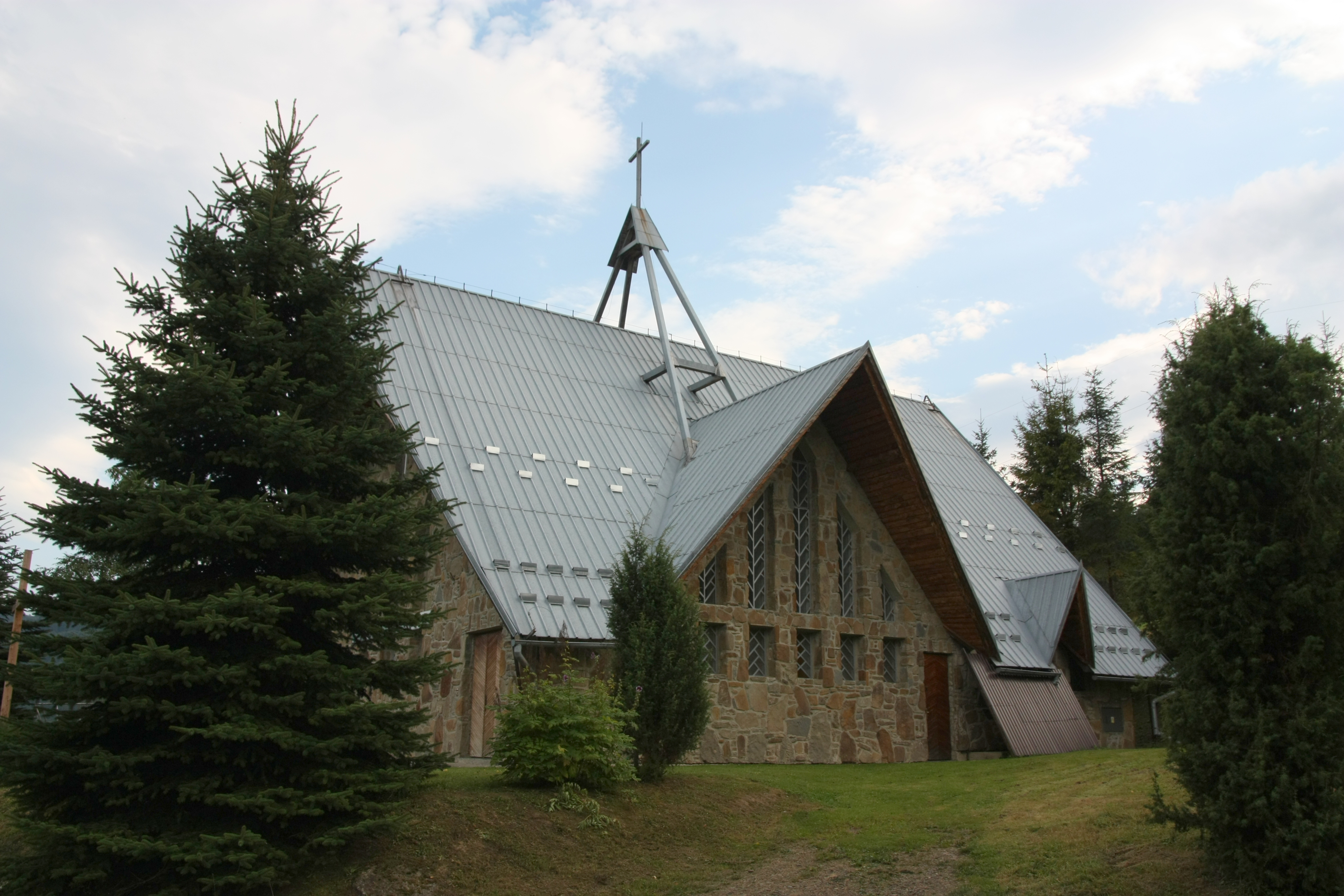
- Church in Rajskie

- Location within Poland
- Coordinates: 49°19′N 22°29′E
- Country: Poland
- Voivodeship: Subcarpathian
- County: Lesko
- Gmina: Solina
- Population: 40

Rajskie [ˈrai̯skʲɛ] is a village in the administrative district of Gmina Solina, within Lesko County, Subcarpathian Voivodeship, in south-eastern Poland.

== Notable residents ==
- Ivan Merdak (1933–2007), Ukrainian woodcarving master, painter and graphic artist
