= Eugène Dupréel =

Belgian philosopher (1879–1967)

Eugène Dupréel (February 8, 1879 – February 14, 1967) was a Belgian philosopher. He had been professor at the Université libre de Bruxelles from 1907 to 1950, teaching logic, metaphysics, Greek philosophy, moral philosophy and sociological theory. He developed an ethical theory and a theory of knowledge deeply influenced by sociology, and worked closely with the Institut de Sociologie Solvay. Leader of the "École de Bruxelles", he had a major influence on the argumentation theorist Chaïm Perelman and thus has been instrumental in the renewal of rhetoric.

== Main work ==
(For a complete bibliography, see « Notice sur Eugène Dupréel », 1980, p. 71-84.)

- Le rapport social : Essai sur l’objet et la méthode de la sociologie, Paris, Alcan, 1912.
- Traité de morale, 2 vol., Bruxelles, Éditions de la Revue de l’Université, 1932.
- Esquisse d’une philosophie des valeurs, Paris, Alcan, 1939.
- Sociologie générale, Paris, Presses universitaire de France, 1948.
- Essais pluralistes, recueil d’articles, Paris, Presses universitaire de France, 1949.
