= Zygmunt Łempicki =

Polish literature theoretician and philosopher

Zygmunt Łempicki (11 May 1886 in Sanok – 21 June 1943 in Auschwitz) was a Polish literature theoretician, Germanist, philosopher, and culture historian. He was an influential figure in Polish German studies of the interwar period.

Łempicki was professor at the Warsaw University from 1919 until 1939, member of the Polish Academy of Skills and editor-in-chief of the "Świat i Życie" encyclopedia.

He was arrested with his wife Wanda and died from typhus in the Nazi concentration camp Auschwitz on 21 June 1943.

== Works ==
- Geschichte der deutschen Literaturwissenschaft... (1920)
- Renesans - oświecenie - romantyzm (1923)
- Wybór pism (t. 1-2 1966)
