= Stanisław Łempicki =

Polish linguist and writer (1886–1947)

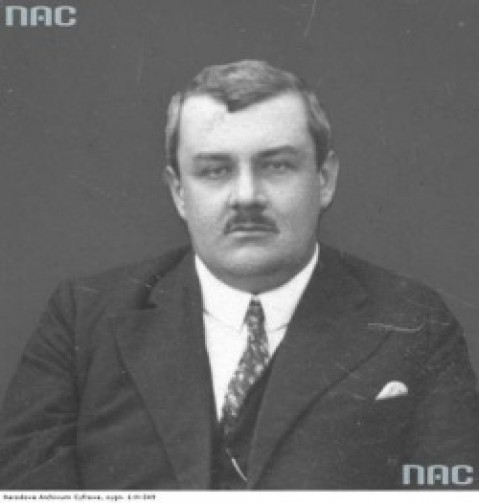
Lempicki

Stanisław Łempicki (1886–1947) was a Polish cultural historian, university professor, linguist and writer. He is considered a member of the Lwów–Warsaw school of thought.
