= Subjunctive mood =

Irrealis grammatical mood

The subjunctive (also known as the conjunctive in some languages) is a grammatical mood—a feature of an utterance that indicates the speaker's attitude toward it. Subjunctive forms of verbs are typically used to express various states of unreality, such as wish, emotion, possibility, judgment, opinion, obligation, or action that has not yet occurred. The precise situations in which they are used vary from language to language. The subjunctive is one of the irrealis moods, which refer to what is not necessarily real. It is often contrasted with the indicative, a realis mood which principally indicates that something is a statement of fact.

In Modern English, subjunctive forms usually employ the bare form of the verb in the present subjunctive (with the third person singular lacking the -s ending), or the use of were instead of was in past subjunctive constructions.

Subjunctives occur most often, although not exclusively, in subordinate clauses—particularly that-clauses. Examples of the subjunctive in English are found in the sentences "I suggest that you be careful" and "It is important that she stay by your side."

== Indo-European languages ==
=== Proto-Indo-European ===
Proto-Indo-European (the reconstructed common ancestor of the Indo-European languages) had two closely related moods: the subjunctive and the optative. Many of its daughter languages combined or merged these moods.

In Indo-European, the subjunctive was formed by using the full ablaut grade of the verb's root and appending the thematic vowel *-e- or *-o- to the root stem, with the full, primary set of personal inflections. The subjunctive was the Indo-European irrealis, used for hypothetical or counterfactual situations.

The optative mood was used to express wishes or hopes, and was formed with a suffix *-ieh_{1} or *-ih_{1} (with a laryngeal). The optative used the clitic set of secondary personal inflections.

Among the Indo-European languages, only Albanian, Avestan, Ancient Greek, and Sanskrit kept the subjunctive and the optative fully separate and parallel. However, in Sanskrit, use of the subjunctive is found only in the Vedic language of the earliest times, and the optative and imperative were comparatively less common. In the later language (from c. 500 BC), the subjunctive fell out of use. The optative or imperative were used instead, or subjunctive was merged with optative as in Latin. However, the first-person forms of the subjunctive continue to be used as they are transferred to the imperative, which formerly, like Greek, had no first person forms.

=== Germanic languages ===
In the Germanic languages, subjunctives are also usually formed from old optatives (a mood that indicates a wish or hope), with the present subjunctive marked with *-ai- and the past with *-ī-. In German, these forms have been reduced to a schwa, spelled -e. The past tense, however, often displays i-umlaut. In Old Norse, both suffixes evolved into -i-, but i-umlaut occurs only in the past subjunctive.

Old Norse active paradigm (set of rules) for the verb grafa ("to dig")
	Present		Past	
Person	Indicative	Subjunctive	Indicative	Subjunctive
1st singular	gref	grafa	gróf	grœfa
2nd singular	grefr	grafir	gróft	grœfir
3rd singular	grefr	grafi	gróf	grœfi
1st plural	grǫfum	grafim	grófum	grœfim
2nd plural	grafið	grafið	grófuð	grœfið
3rd plural	grafa	grafi	grófu	grœfi

==== English ====
In Modern English, the subjunctive is realised as a finite but tenseless clause where the main verb occurs in the bare form. Since the bare form is also used in a variety of other constructions, the English subjunctive is reflected by a clause type rather than a distinct inflection.

==== German ====
German has:

- Konjunktiv Präsens, which is a Konjunktiv I, e.g. "er gehe"
- Konjunktiv Imperfekt (or Präteritum), which is a Konjunktiv II, e.g. "er ginge"
- Konjunktiv Perfekt, which is a Konjunktiv I too, e.g. "er sei gegangen"
- Konjunktiv Plusquamperfekt, which is a Konjunktiv II too, e.g. "er wäre gegangen"

If the Konjunktiv II of the Futur I (e.g. "ich würde gehen") and of the Futur II (e.g. "ich würde gegangen sein") are called "conditional", the numbers (I, II) can be dropped.

===== Konjunktiv I =====
The present subjunctive occurs in certain expressions (e.g. Es lebe der König! 'Long live the king!') and in indirect (reported) speech. Its use can frequently be replaced by the indicative mood. For example, Er sagte, er sei Arzt ('He said he was a physician') is a neutral representation of what was said and makes no claim as to whether the speaker thinks the reported statement is true or not.

The past subjunctive can often be used to express the same sentiments: Er sagte, er wäre Arzt. Or, for example, instead of the formal, written Er sagte, er habe keine Zeit 'He said he had no time' with present subjunctive habe, one can use past subjunctive hätte: Er sagte, er hätte keine Zeit.

However, in speech, the past subjunctive is common without any implication of doubt by the speaker. Use of the indicative Er sagte, er ist Arzt and Er sagte, er hat keine Zeit is also common. This is often changed in written reports to the forms using present subjunctive.

The present subjunctive is regular for all verbs except the verb sein ('to be'). It is formed by adding -e, -est, -e, -en, -et, -en to the stem of the infinitive. The verb sein has the stem sei- for the present subjunctive declension, but it has no ending for the first and third person singular. While the use of present subjunctive for reported speech is formal and common in newspaper articles, its use in colloquial speech is in decline.

It is possible to express the subjunctive in various tenses, including the perfect (er sei da gewesen 'he has [apparently] been there') and the future (er werde da sein 'he will be there'). For the preterite, which forms the Konjunktiv II with a somewhat different meaning, indirect speech must switch to the perfect tense, so that: Er sagte: "Ich war da." becomes Er sagte, er sei da gewesen.

===== Konjunktiv II =====
The KII, or past subjunctive, is used to form the conditional. On occasion, it is also used as a replacement for the present subjunctive when the indicative and subjunctive moods of a verb are indistinguishable.

Every German verb has a past subjunctive conjugation, but in spoken German, the conditional is most commonly formed using würde with an infinitive. Würde is the KII form of werden, which is related to the English will or would rather than the literal to become (dialect: täte, KII of tun 'to do'). For example: An deiner Stelle würde ich ihm nicht helfen 'I would not help him if I were you'. In the example, the Konjunktiv II form of helfen (hülfe) is very unusual. However, using würde instead of hätte and wäre can be perceived anywhere from awkward (in-the-present use of the past subjunctive) to incorrect (in the past subjunctive). There is a tendency to use the forms in würde rather in main clauses as in English; in subclauses, even regular forms (which sound like the obsolete indicative of the preterite) can still be heard.

Some verbs exist where either construction can be used, such as with finden (fände) and tun (täte). Many dictionaries consider the past subjunctive declension of such verbs the only proper expression in formal written German.

The past subjunctive is declined from the stem of the preterite (imperfect) declension of the verb with the appropriate present subjunctive declension ending as appropriate. In most cases, an umlaut is appended to the stem vowel if possible (i.e. if it is a, o, u or au), for example: ich war → ich wäre, ich brachte → ich brächte.

==== Dutch ====
Dutch has the same subjunctive tenses as German (described above), though they are rare in contemporary speech. The same two tenses as in German are sometimes considered subjunctive mood (aanvoegende wijs) and sometimes conditional mood (voorwaardelijke wijs). In practice, potentially subjunctive uses of verbs are difficult to differentiate from indicative uses. This is partly because the subjunctive mood has fallen together with the indicative mood:

- The plural of the subjunctive (both present and past) is always identical to the plural of the indicative. There are a few exceptions where the usage is clearly subjunctive, such as Mogen zij in vrede rusten (May they rest in peace) compared to the singular Moge hij/zij in vrede rusten (May he/she rest in peace).
- In the present tense, the singular form of the subjunctive differs from the indicative by the addition of -e. For example, the subjunctive God zegene je, mijn kind (May God bless you, my child) differs from the indicative God zegent je, mijn kind (God blesses you, my child.)
- In the past tense, the singular subjunctive form of weak verbs (the vast majority of verbs) is identical to the indicative. Only for strong verbs, the preterite-present verbs, and some irregular weak verbs does the past subjunctive differ from the past indicative, and only in the singular form. For example, the subjunctive hadde, ware and mochte differ from the indicative "had", "was" and mocht ("had", "was" and "could").

Archaic and traditional phrases still contain the subjunctive mood:

- Men neme ... ('Take ...' – literally 'one take ...' – as found in recipes)
- Uw naam worde geheiligd ('Thy name be hallowed' – from the Lord's Prayer)
- Geheiligd zij Uw naam ('Hallowed be thy name' – from the Lord's Prayer, as used in Belgium until 2016)
- Zo waarlijk helpe mij God almachtig ('So truly help me God almighty' – when swearing an oath)
- Godverdomme (now a common Dutch curse; originally a request to God to curse something)
- God zij dank ('Thanks be to God')
- Dankzij ... ('Thanks to ...' – literally 'Thank be ...')
- Leve de koning ('Long live the king')

==== Luxembourgish ====
Luxembourgish has the same subjunctive tenses as German (described above). For the periphrasis however, géif is used instead of würde or (dialectal) täte.

==== Swedish ====
The subjunctive mood is rarely used in modern Swedish and is limited to a few fixed expressions like leve kungen, "long live the king". Present subjunctive is formed by adding the -e ending to the stem of a verb:

Infinitive	Present tense indicative	Present tense subjunctive
att tala, "to speak"	talar, "speak(s)"	tale, "may speak"
att bli, "to become"	blir, "become(s)"	blive, "may become" (the -v- comes from the older form bliva)
att skriva, "to write"	skriver, "write(s)"	skrive, "may write"
att springa, "to run"	springer, "run(s)"	springe, "may run"

Infinitive	Past tense indicative	Supine indicative	Past tense subjunctive
att finnas, "to exist (be)"	fanns, "existed (there was)"	funnits, "has existed (there has been)"	om det funnes tid, "if only there were time" (changes past tense -a- to supine -u-)
att bli, "to become"	blev, "became"	blivit, "have/has become"	om det bleve så, "if only it became so" (regular: just appends -e to the past tense)
att skriva, "to write"	skrev, "wrote"	skrivit, "written"	om jag skreve ett brev, "if I should write a letter" (regular: appends -e)

=== Latin and the Romance languages ===
==== Latin ====
The Latin subjunctive has many uses, contingent upon the nature of a clause within a sentence:

Within independent clauses:

- Exhortation or command
- Concession
- Wish
- Question of doubt
- Possibility or contingency

Within dependent clauses:

- Condition
- Purpose
- Characteristic
- Result
- Time
- Indirect questions

Historically, the Latin subjunctive originates from the ancestral optative inflections, while some of the original subjunctive forms went on to compose the Latin future tense, especially in the Latin third conjugation. The influence of *-i- from the old optative forms may be found in the typically high vowel of Latin subjunctives, even when the indicative mood has a lower vowel. For example, Latin rogamus 'we ask', in the indicative mood, corresponds to the subjunctive rogemus, 'let us ask', where e is a higher vowel than a.

Latin present subjunctive forms
Conjugation	1st	2nd	3rd	3rd^{IO}	4th
1st singular	rogem	habeam	curram	excipiam	veniam
2nd singular	roges	habeas	curras	excipias	venias
3rd singular	roget	habeat	currat	excipiat	veniat
1st plural	rogemus	habeamus	curramus	excipiamus	veniamus
2nd plural	rogetis	habeatis	curratis	excipiatis	veniatis
3rd plural	rogent	habeant	currant	excipiant	veniant

The subjunctive mood retains a highly distinct form for nearly all verbs in Portuguese, Spanish and Italian (among other Romance languages), and for a number of verbs in French. All of these languages inherit their subjunctive from Latin, where the subjunctive mood combines both forms and usages from a number of original Indo-European inflection sets, including the original subjunctive and the optative mood.

In many cases, the Romance languages use the subjunctive in the same ways that English does, though there are exceptions. For example, English generally uses the auxiliary may or let to form desiderative expressions, such as "Let it snow". The Romance languages use the subjunctive for these; French, for example, says, Qu'il neige and Qu'ils vivent jusqu'à leur vieillesse. However, in the case of the first-person plural, these languages have imperative forms: 'Let us go' in French is Allons-y. In addition, the Romance languages tend to use the subjunctive in various kinds of subordinate clauses, such as those introduced by words meaning although, e.g. English: "Although I am old, I feel young"; French: Bien que je sois vieux, je me sens jeune.

In Spanish, phrases with words like lo que (that which, what), quien (who), or donde (where) and subjunctive verb forms are often translated to English with some variation of "whatever" or sometimes an indefinite pronoun. Spanish lo que sea, more literally translated as "the thing which is", is interpreted in English as "whatever" or "anything". Similarly, Spanish donde sea is English "wherever" and Spanish quien sea is English "whoever". For example, Spanish lo que quieras, literally "that which you want", is translated as English "whatever you may want"; Spanish cueste lo que cueste is translated to English as "whatever it may cost"; and Spanish donde vayas, voy is translated to English as "wherever you go, I go". The acronym W.E.I.R.D.O. is commonly used by English-speaking students of Spanish to learn the subjunctive. It usually stands for Wish Emotion Impersonal Expressions Recommendations Doubt Ojalá. With the exception of negative commands, the subjunctive is always activated in the second clause when a situation of "W.E.I.R.D.O" is present.

==== French ====
Present and past subjunctives

The subjunctive is used mostly with verbs or adverbs expressing desire, doubt or eventuality; it may also express an order. It is almost always preceded by the conjunction que ('that').

Use of the subjunctive is in many respects similar to English:

- Jussive (issuing orders, commanding, or exhorting): Il faut qu'il comprenne cela ('It is necessary that he understand that')
- Desiderative: Vive la république! ('Long live the republic!')

Sometimes it is not:

- Desiderative: Que la lumière soit! ('Let there be light!')
- In certain subordinate clauses:
  - Bien que ce soit mon anniversaire: ('Even though it is my birthday') (although English does introduce a similar subjunctive element in an alternative: "It might be my birthday, but I am working"
  - Avant que je ne m’en aille ('Before I go away')

English	French
It is important that she speak. (subjunctive)	Il est important qu'elle parle
That the book pleases you does not surprise me. (indicative)	Que le livre te plaise ne me surprend pas.
	present subjunctive

French uses a past subjunctive, equivalent in tense to the passé composé in the indicative mood, called passé du subjonctif. It is the only other subjunctive tense used in modern-day conversational French. It is formed with the auxiliary être or avoir and the past participle of the verb. Unlike other Romance languages, such as Spanish, it is not always necessary that the preceding clause be in the past to trigger the passé du subjonctif in the subordinate clause:

English	French
It is important that she have spoken. (subjunctive)	Il est important qu'elle ait parlé.
That the book pleased you does not surprise me. (indicative)	Que le livre t'ait plu ne me surprend pas.
	past subjunctive

Imperfect and pluperfect subjunctives

French also has an imperfect subjunctive, which in older, formal, or literary writing, replaces the present subjunctive in a subordinate clause when the main clause is in a past tense (including in the French conditional, which is morphologically a future-in-the-past):

English	French	
English	modern spoken	older, formal, or literary
It was necessary that he speak	Il était nécessaire qu’il parle	Il était nécessaire qu’il parlât
I feared that he act so.	Je craignais qu'il agisse ainsi	Je craignais qu'il agît ainsi
I would want him to do it.	Je voudrais qu’il le fasse	Je voudrais qu’il le fît
	present subjunctive	imperfect subjunctive

Example quotes

Pour une brave dame, / Monsieur, qui vous honore, et de toute son âme
Voudrait que vous vinssiez, à ma sommation, / Lui faire un petit mot de réparation.

— Jean Racine (1669), Les Plaideurs, 2.4.16–19

[...] je voudrais que vous vinssiez une fois à Berlin pour y rester, et que vous eussiez la force de soustraire votre légère nacelle aux bourrasques et aux vents qui l'ont battue si souvent en France.

— Œuvres complètes de Voltaire (1828), Paris, page 595

J'aimerais qu'ils fissent leur début comme sous-maîtres dans les écoles importantes.

— Théodore Henri Barrau (1842), De l'éducation morale de la jeunesse, page 191

Je craignais que vous ne voulussiez pas me recevoir.

— Eugène Sue (1847), Martin et Bamboche, 3.3.7

Similarly, pluperfect subjunctive replace past subjunctive in same context:

English	French	
English	modern spoken	older, formal, or literary
It was necessary that you have spoken	Il était nécessaire que tu aies parlé	Il était nécessaire que tu eusses parlé
I regretted that you had acted so.	Je regrettais que tu aies agi ainsi	Je regrettais que tu eusses agi ainsi
I would have liked you to have done it.	J'aurais aimé que tu l'aies fait	J'aurais aimé que tu l'eusses fait
	past subjunctive	pluperfect subjunctive

Example quotes

Ma lettre, à laquelle vous venez de répondre, a fait un effet bien différent que je n'attendois : elle vous a fait partir, et moi je comptois qu'elle vous feroit rester jusqu'à ce que vous eussiez reçu des nouvelles du départ de mon manuscrit; au moins étoit-ce le sens littéral et spirituel de ma lettre.

— Montesquieu, Lettres familières, 18

==== Italian ====
The Italian subjunctive (congiuntivo) is commonly used. However, especially in the spoken language, it is sometimes substituted by the indicative.

The subjunctive is used mainly in subordinate clauses following a set phrase or conjunction, such as benché, senza che, prima che, or perché. It is also used with verbs of doubt, possibility, and expressing an opinion or desire—for example, with credo che, è possibile che and ritengo che, and sometimes with superlatives and virtual superlatives.

- English: I believe (that) she is the best.
- Italian: (Io) credo (che) (ella/lei) sia la migliore.

The Italian subjunctive is used after expressions like Penso che ('I think that'), where in French the indicative would be used. However, it is also possible to use the subjunctive after the expression Je ne pense pas que... ('I don't think that...'), and in questions like Penses-tu que... ('Do you think that...'), even though the indicative forms are also correct.

===== Present subjunctive =====
The present subjunctive is similar to, but still mostly distinguishable from, the present indicative. Subject pronouns are often used with the present subjunctive where they are normally omitted in the indicative; in the first, second, and third person singular forms they are the same, so the person is not implied by the verb. Irregular verbs tend to follow the first person singular form, such as the present subjunctive forms of andare, which goes to vada etc. (first person singular form is vado).

The present subjunctive is used in a range of situations when clauses take the subjunctive.

- English: 'It is possible that they have to leave.'
- Italian: È possibile che debbano partire.
- English: 'My parents want me to play the piano.'
- Italian: I miei genitori vogliono che io suoni il pianoforte.

The present subjunctive is used mostly in subordinate clauses, as in the examples above. However, exceptions include imperatives using the subjunctive (in the third person), and general statements of desire.

- English: 'Be careful!'
- Italian: Stia attento!
- English: 'Long live the republic!'
- Italian: Viva la repubblica!

===== Imperfect subjunctive =====
The Italian imperfect subjunctive is very similar in appearance to the French imperfect subjunctive, but is used much more in speech. Its forms are largely regular, apart from the verbs essere, dare and stare (which go to fossi, dessi and stessi etc.). Verbs with a contracted infinitive, such as dire (short for dicere) revert to the longer form in the imperfect subjunctive (to give dicessi etc., for example).

The imperfect subjunctive is used in subordinate clauses taking the subjunctive where the sense of the verb requires the imperfect.

- English: 'It seemed that Elsa was not coming.'
- Italian: Sembrava che Elsa non venisse.
- English: The teacher slowed down, so that we would understand everything.'
- Italian: L’insegnante rallentava, affinché capissimo tutto.

The imperfect subjunctive is used in if clauses, where the main clause is in the conditional tense, as in English and German.

- English: 'If I had a lot of money, I would buy many cars.'
- Italian: Se avessi molti soldi, comprerei tante automobili.
- English: 'You would know if we were lying.'
- Italian: Sapresti se mentissimo.

===== Perfect and pluperfect subjunctives =====
The perfect and pluperfect subjunctives are formed much like the indicative perfect and pluperfect, except the auxiliary (either avere or essere) verb takes the present and imperfect subjunctive respectively.

They are used in subordinate clauses which require the subjunctive, where the sense of the verb requires use of the perfect or pluperfect.

- English: Although they had not killed the doctor, the police arrested the men.'
- Italian: Benché non avessero ucciso il medico, la polizia arrestò gli uomini.
- English: 'I would have done it, provided you had helped me.'
- Italian: Lo avrei fatto, purché tu mi avessi assistito.

==== Spanish ====
The subjunctive mood (subjuntivo) is a fundamental element of Spanish. The spoken language makes use of it to a much larger degree than other Latin languages and it is in no case homonymous to any other mood. It is common to find long, complex sentences almost entirely in the subjunctive.

The subjunctive is used in conjunction with impersonal expressions and expressions of emotion, opinion, desire or viewpoint. More importantly, it applies to most hypothetical situations, likely or unlikely, desired or not. Normally, only certitude of (or statement of) a fact will remove the possibility of its use. Unlike French, it is also used in phrases expressing the past conditional. The negative of the imperative shares the same form with the present subjunctive.

Common introductions to the subjunctive would include:

- que... or de que... as in que sea (present subjunctive) lo que Dios quiera (present subjunctive): 'Let it be what God wills'.
- Si...: 'If...' (e.g. si estuvieras: 'if you were...')
- Donde: 'Where...' (e.g. donde sea, 'anywhere')
- Cuando: 'When...' (referring to a future time, e.g. cuando vaya, 'when I go')
- Aunque: 'Despite/although/even if...'
- Ojalá... 'I hope...' (derived from Arabic إن شاء ألله, in šāʾ ʾallāh, 'God willing') e.g. Ojalá que llueva (present subjunctive) 'I hope it rains' or Ojalá que lloviera (past subjunctive) 'I wish it would rain'.

Nevertheless, the subjunctive can stand alone to supplant other tenses.

For example, "I would like" can be said in the conditional Querría or in the past subjunctive Quisiera, as in Quisiera (past subjunctive) que vinieras (past subjunctive), i.e. "I would like you to come".

A second-language speaker's comfort with or avoidance of the subjunctive form can be an indicator of their level of proficiency in the language. Complex use of the subjunctive is a constant pattern in everyday speech among native speakers, but it is difficult to internallize, even for relatively proficient Spanish learners (e.g. I would have liked you to come on Thursday: Me habría gustado (conditional perfect) que vinieras (past subjunctive) el jueves).

An example of the Spanish subjunctive's subtlety may be found in the way tense (past, present or future) modifies the expression "be it as it may" (literally "be what it be"):

- Sea lo que sea (present subjunctive + present subjunctive): 'No matter what/whatever.'
- Sea lo que fuera (present subjunctive + past subjunctive): 'Whatever it were.'
- Fuera lo que fuera (past subjunctive + past subjunctive): (Similar meaning to above).
- Sea lo que fuere. (Present subjunctive + future subjunctive): 'Whatever it may be.'
- Fuera lo que hubiera sido. (Past subjunctive + past pluperfect subjunctive): 'Whatever/no matter what it may have been.'

The same alterations could be made to the expression Sea como sea or 'no matter how' with similar changes in meaning.

Spanish has two past subjunctive forms. They are almost identical, except that where the first form has ‑ra‑, the second form has ‑se‑. Both forms are usually interchangeable, although the ‑se‑ form may be more common in Spain than in other Spanish-speaking areas. The ‑ra‑ forms may also be used as an alternative to the conditional in certain structures.

Present subjunctive

In Spanish, a present subjunctive form is always different from the corresponding present indicative form. For example, whereas English "that they speak" or French qu'ils parlent can be either indicative or subjunctive, Spanish que hablen is unambiguously subjunctive (the corresponding indicative would be que hablan). The same is true for all verbs, regardless of their subject.

Present subjunctive is used when there are two clauses, separated by que. However, not all que clauses require the subjunctive mood. They must have at least one of the following criteria:

- The verb of the main clause expresses emotion (e.g. fear, happiness, sorrow, etc.).
- Impersonal expressions are used in the main clause. (It is important that...)
- The verb in the second clause is in the subjunctive.

For example:

- Ojalá que me compren (comprar) un regalo. ('I hope that they will buy me a gift.')
- Te recomiendo que no corras (correr) con tijeras. ('I recommend that you not run with scissors.')
- Dudo que el restaurante abra (abrir) a las seis. ('I doubt that the restaurant might open at six.')
- Lo discutiremos cuando venga (venir). ('We will talk about it when he/she comes.')
- Es importante que (nosotros) hagamos ejercicio. ('It is important that we exercise.')
- Me alegro de que (tú) seas mi amiga. ('I am happy that you are my friend.')

Past (imperfect) subjunctive

Used interchangeably, the past (imperfect) subjunctive can end either in ‑se or ‑ra. Both forms stem from the third-person plural (ellos, ellas, ustedes) of the preterite. For example, the verb estar, when conjugated in the third-person plural of the preterite, becomes estuvieron. Then, drop the ‑ron ending, and add either ‑se or ‑ra. Thus, it becomes estuviese or estuviera. The past subjunctive may be used with "if... then" statements with the conditional mood. For example, Si yo fuera/fuese el maestro, no mandaría demasiados deberes. ('If I were the teacher, I would not give too much homework.')

Future subjunctive

In Spanish, the future subjunctive tense is now rare but still used in certain dialects of Spanish and in formal speech. It is usually reserved for literature, archaic phrases and expressions, and legal documents. The form is similar to the ‑ra form of the imperfect subjunctive, but with a ‑re ending instead of ‑ra, ‑res instead of ‑ras and so on. For example, Si así yo no lo hiciere, que Dios y la patria me lo demanden. (If I don't do it, may God and the fatherland demand it from me.)

Phrases expressing the subjunctive in a future period normally employ the present subjunctive. For example: 'I hope that it will rain tomorrow' would simply be Espero que llueva mañana (where llueva is the third-person singular present subjunctive of llover, 'to rain').

Pluperfect (past perfect) subjunctive

In Spanish, the pluperfect subjunctive tense is used to describe a continuing wish in the past. For example, Desearía que (tú) hubieras ido al cine conmigo el viernes pasado. ('I wish that you had gone to the movies with me last Friday'). To form this tense, first the subjunctive form of haber is conjugated (in the example above, haber becomes hubieras). Then the participle of the main verb is conjugated (in this case, it is added: ir becomes ido).

- Me gustaría que 'hubieras ido'/'hubieses ido', pero él suspendió su examen de matemáticas. ('I would have liked if you had gone, but he failed his math test.')

The ‑se form of the imperfect subjunctive derives from the pluperfect subjunctive of Vulgar Latin, and the ‑ra from the pluperfect indicative, which combine to overtake the previous pluperfect subjunctive ending. The ‑re form is more complicated, originating in a fusion of the perfect subjunctive and future perfect indicative (which, though in different moods, happened to be identical in the second and third persons) before losing the perfect in the shift to future subjunctive. So the ‑ra and ‑se forms always had a past (to be specific, pluperfect) meaning, but only the ‑se form always belonged with the subjunctive mood that the ‑re form had since its emergence.

==== Portuguese ====
In Portuguese, as in Spanish, the subjunctive (subjuntivo or conjuntivo) is complex, being generally used to talk about situations which are seen as doubtful, imaginary, hypothetical, demanded, or required. It can also express emotion, opinion, disagreement, denial, or a wish. Its value is similar to that of the subjunctive in formal English:

Present subjunctive

- Command: Faça-se luz! 'Let there be light!'
- Wish: Viva o rei! 'Long live the king!'
- Necessity: É importante que ele compreenda isso. 'It is important that he understand that.'
- In certain, subordinate clauses:
  - Ainda que seja o meu aniversário... 'Even though it be my birthday...'
  - Antes que eu vá... 'Before I go...'

Imperfect (past) subjunctive

As in Spanish, the imperfect subjunctive is in vernacular use. It is employed, among other uses, to make the tense of a subordinate clause agree with the tense of the main clause:

- English: It is [present indicative] necessary that you (pl.) speak [present subjunctive]. → It was [past indicative] necessary that you (pl.) speak [present subjunctive].
- Portuguese: É [present indicative] necessário que vós faleis [present subjunctive]. → Era necessário [past (imperfect) indicative] que vós falásseis [past (imperfect) subjunctive].

The imperfect subjunctive is also used when the main clause is in the conditional:

- English: It would be [conditional] necessary that he speak [present subjunctive].
- Portuguese: Seria [conditional] necessário que ele falasse [imperfect subjunctive].

There are authors who regard the conditional of Portuguese as a "future in the past" of the indicative mood, rather than as a separate mood; they call it futuro do pretérito ('future of the past'), especially in Brazil.

Future subjunctive

Portuguese differs from other Ibero-Romance languages in having retained the medieval future subjunctive (futuro do subjuntivo), which is rarely used in Spanish and has been lost in other West Iberic languages. It expresses a condition that must be fulfilled in the future, or is assumed to be fulfilled, before an event can happen. Spanish and English will use the present tense in this type of clause.

For example, in conditional sentences whose main clause is in the conditional, Portuguese, Spanish and English employ the past tense in the subordinate clause. However, if the main clause is in the future, Portuguese will employ the future subjunctive where English and Spanish use the present indicative. (English, when being used in a rigorously formal style, takes the present subjunctive in these situations. For example, "Should I be, then...").

- English: If I were [past subjunctive] king, I would end [conditional] hunger.
  - Spanish: Si fuera [imperfect subjunctive] rey, acabaría con [conditional] el hambre.
  - Portuguese: Se fosse [imperfect subjunctive] rei, acabaria com [conditional] a fome.
- English: If I am [present indicative] [technical English is "should I be" present subjunctive] elected president, I will change [future indicative] the law.
  - Spanish: Si soy [present indicative] elegido presidente, cambiaré [future indicative] la ley.
  - Portuguese: Se for [future subjunctive] eleito presidente, mudarei [future indicative] a lei.

The first situation is counterfactual; the listener knows that the speaker is not a king. However, the second statement expresses a promise about the future; the speaker may yet be elected president.

For a different example, a father speaking to his son might say:

- English: When you are [present indicative] older, you will understand [future indicative].
- Spanish: Cuando seas [present subjunctive] mayor, comprenderás [future indicative].
- French: Quand tu seras [future indicative] grand, tu comprendras [future indicative].
- Italian: Quando sarai [future indicative] grande, comprenderai [future indicative].
- Portuguese: Quando fores [future subjunctive] mais velho, compreenderás [future indicative].

The future subjunctive is identical in form to the personal infinitive in regular verbs, but they differ in some irregular verbs of frequent use. However, the possible differences between the two tenses are due only to stem changes. They always have the same endings.

The meaning of sentences can change by switching subjunctive and indicative:

- Ele pensou que eu fosse alto (He thought that I was tall [and I am not])
- Ele pensou que eu era alto (He thought that I was tall [and I am or I am not sure whether I am or not])
- Se formos lá (If we go there)
- Se vamos lá (equivalent to "if we are going there")

Below, there is a table demonstrating subjunctive and conditional conjugation for regular verbs of the first paradigm (-ar), exemplified by falar (to speak) .

Grammatical person	Past subjunctive	Present subjunctive	Future subjunctive	Conditional (future of past)
Eu	falasse	fale	falar	falaria
Tu	falasses	fales	falares	falarias
Ele/Ela	falasse	fale	falar	falaria
Nós	falássemos	falemos	falarmos	falaríamos
Vós	falásseis	faleis	falardes	falaríeis
Eles/Elas	falassem	falem	falarem	falariam

Compound subjunctives

Compound verbs in subjunctive are necessary in more complex sentences, such as subordinate clauses with embedded perfective tenses e.g., perfective state in the future. To form compound subjunctives, auxiliar verbs (ter or haver) must conjugate to the respective subjunctive tense, while the main verbs must take their participles.

- Queria que houvesses sido eleito presidente. ('I wish you had been elected president.')
- É importante que hajas compreendido isso. ('It is important that you have comprehended that.')
- Quando houver sido eleito presidente, mudarei a lei. ('When I will have been elected president, I will change the law')
- A cidade haver-se-ia afundado se não fosse por seus alicerces. ('The city would have sunk, if not for its foundation')

Grammatical person	Past subjunctive	Present subjunctive	Future subjunctive	Conditional
Eu	houvesse/tivesse falado	haja/tenha falado	houver/tiver falado	haveria/teria falado
Tu	houvesses/tivesses falado	hajas/tenhas falado	houveres/tiveres falado	haverias/terias falado
Ele/Ela	houvesse/tivesse falado	haja/tenha falado	houver/tiver falado	haveria/teria falado
Nós	houvéssemos/tivéssemos falado	hajamos/tenhamos falado	houvermos/tivermos falado	haveríamos/teríamos falado
Vós	houvésseis/tivésseis falado	hajais/tenhais falado	houverdes/tiverdes falado	haveríeis/teríeis falado
Eles/Elas	houvessem/tivessem falado	hajam/tenham falado	houverem/tivermos falado	haveriam/teriam falado

==== Romanian ====
Romanian is part of the Balkan Sprachbund and, as such, uses the subjunctive (conjunctiv) more extensively than other Romance languages. The subjunctive forms always include the conjunction să, which plays the role of a morphological structural element within these verbal forms. The subjunctive has two tenses: the past tense and the present tense. It is usually used in subordinate clauses.

Present subjunctive

The present subjunctive is usually built in the 1st and 2nd person singular and plural by adding the conjunction să before the present indicative (indicative am 'I have' to subjunctive să am '(that) I have'; indicative vii 'you come' to subjunctive să vii '(that) you come'). In the 3rd person most verbs have a specific subjunctive form which differs from the indicative either in the ending or in the stem itself. However, there is no distinction between the singular and plural of the present subjunctive in the 3rd person. For example, are 'he has' and au 'they have' in the subjunctive are să aibă '(that) he has' and să aibă '(that) they have'.

The present tense is by far the most widely used of the two subjunctive tenses and is used frequently after verbs that express wish, preference, permission, possibility, request, advice, etc.: a vrea 'to want', a dori 'to wish', a prefera 'to prefer', a lăsa 'to let, to allow', a ruga 'to ask', a sfătui 'to advise', etc.

When used independently, the subjunctive has modal and imperative values—it indicates a desire, a fear, an order or a request. The present subjunctive is used in questions having the modal value of should:

- Să plec? 'Should I leave?'
- Să mai stau? 'Should I stay longer?'
- De ce să plece? 'Why should he/she leave?'

The present subjunctive is often used as an imperative, mainly for other persons than the second person. When used with the second person, it is even stronger than the imperative. The first-person plural can be preceded by the interjection hai, which intensifies the imperative meaning of the structure:

- Să mergem! 'Let us go!' or Hai să mergem! 'Come on, let's go!'
- Să plece imediat! 'I want him to leave immediately!'
- Să-mi aduci un pahar de apă! 'Bring me a glass of water!'

The subjunctive present is used in certain set phrases used as greetings in specific situations:

- Să creşti mare! (to a child after they have declared their age or thanked someone)
- Să ne (să-ţi, să vă) fie de bine! (to people who have finished their meals)
- Să-l (să o, să le etc.) porţi sănătos / sănătoasă! (when someone shows up in new clothes, with new shoes)
- Dumnezeu să-l (s-o, să-i, să le) ierte! (after mentioning the name of a person who died recently)

Past subjunctive

The past tense of the subjunctive mood has one form for all persons and numbers of all verbs: să fi followed by the past participle of the verb. The past subjunctive is used after the past optative-conditional of verbs that require the subjunctive (a trebui, a vrea, a putea, a fi bine, a fi necesar, etc.), in constructions that express necessity or desire in the past:

- Ar fi trebuit să fi rămas acasă. 'You should have stayed home.'
- Ar fi fost mai bine să mai fi stat. 'It would have been better if we had stayed longer.'

When used independently, the past subjunctive indicates a regret related to a past-accomplished action that is seen as undesirable at the moment of speaking:

- Să fi rămas acasă. 'We should have stayed at home.' (Note: the same construction can be used for all persons and numbers.)

=== Celtic languages ===
==== Welsh ====
In Welsh, there are two forms of the subjunctive: present and imperfect. The present subjunctive is barely ever used in spoken Welsh except in certain fixed phrases, and is restricted in most cases to the third person singular. However, it is more likely to be found in literary Welsh, most widely in more old-fashioned registers. The third-person singular is properly used after certain conjunctions and prepositions, but in spoken Welsh the present subjunctive is frequently replaced by either the infinitives, the present tense, the conditional, or the future tense (called the present-future by some grammarians).

Present indicative		Present subjunctive	
English	Welsh	English	Welsh
I am	(Ry)dw i/... ydw i	(that) I be	bwyf, byddwyf
Thou art	(R)wyt ti/... wyt ti	(that) thou be[est]	bych, byddych
He is	Mae e/... ydy e Mae o/...ydy o	(that) he be	bo, byddo
One is	Ydys	(that) one be	bydder
We are	(Ry)dyn ni/...dyn ni (Ry)dan ni/... dan ni	(that) we be	bôm, byddom
You are	(Ry)dych chi/...dych chi (Ry)dach chi/... dach chi	(that) you be	boch, byddoch
They are	Maen nhw/...dyn nhw	(that) they be	bônt, byddont

Literary English	Literary Welsh	Spoken English	Spoken Welsh
When need be	Pan fo angen	When there'll be need	Pan fydd angen
Before it be	Cyn (y) bo	Before it's	Cyn iddi fod
In order that there be	Fel y bo	In order for there to be	Er mwyn bod
She left so that she be safe	Gadawodd hi fel y bo hi'n ddiogel	She left so that she'd be safe	Gadawodd hi fel y byddai hi'n ddiogel
It is time that I go	Mae'n amser yr elwyf	It's time for me to go	Mae'n amser imi fynd

The imperfect subjunctive, as in English, only affects the verb bod ('to be'). It is used after pe (a form of 'if') and it must be accompanied by the conditional subjunctive e.g. Pe bawn i'n gyfoethog, teithiwn i trwy'r byd. ('If I were rich, I would travel throughout the world.')

Imperfect indicative		Conditional subjunctive		Imperfect subjunctive	
English	Welsh	English	Welsh	English	Welsh
I was	(R)oeddwn i	I would be	byddwn i	(that) I were	bawn i
Thou wast	(R)oeddet ti	Thou wouldst be	byddet ti	(that) thou wert	baet ti
He was She was	(R)oedd e/o (R)oedd hi	He would be She would be	byddai fe/fo byddai hi	(that) he were (that) she were	bai fe/fo bai hi
One was	(R)oeddid	One would be	byddid	(that) one were	byddid
We were	(R)oeddem ni	We would be	byddem ni	(that) we were	baem ni
You were	(R)oeddech chi	You would be	byddech chi	(that) you were	baech chi
They were	(R)oedden nhw	They would be	bydden nhw	(that) they were	baent hwy

For all other verbs in Welsh, as in English, the imperfect subjunctive takes the same stems as do the conditional subjunctive and the imperfect indicative.

==== Scottish Gaelic ====
In Scottish Gaelic, the subjunctive does exist but still takes its forms from the indicative: the present subjunctive takes the dependent future forms and the past subjunctive takes the conditional forms. The subjunctive is normally used in proverbs or truisms in phrases that start with 'May...'. For example:

- Gum bi Rìgh Ruisiart beò fada! 'Long live King Richard' (lit. 'May King Richard live long').
- Gum bi beanachd Dè oirbh uile! 'May God bless you all!'
- Gun gabh e a fhois ann sìth. 'May he rest in peace.'

In a more demanding or wishful statement, the subjunctive may be used as a conjunction:

- Se àm gum fàg e a-nis. 'It is time that he leave now.'
- Tha e riatanach gun tèid iad gu sgoil gach là. 'It is necessary that they go to school every day.'
- Dh'fhaighnich e nach faic mi ise. 'He asked that I not see her.'

The subjunctive in Gaelic will sometimes have the conjunction gun (or gum before verbs beginning with labial consonants), which can be translated as 'that' or as 'May...' while making a wish. For negatives, nach is used instead.

Note that the present subjunctive is identical to the dependent future tense form, which lacks the ending -idh.

Present indicative		Future		Present subjunctive	
English	Gaelic	English	Gaelic	English	Gaelic
I am	Tha mi/ Is mise	I will be	Bidh mi	(that) I be	(gum) bi mi
Thou art	Tha thu/ Is tusa	Thou wilt be	Bidh tu	(that) thou be[est]	(gum) bi thu
He is	Tha e/ Is e	He will be	Bidh e	(that) he be	(gum) bi e
One is	Thathar	One will be	Bithear	(that) one be	(gum) bithear
We are	Tha sinn/ Is sinne	We will be	Bidh sinn	(that) we be	(gum) bi sinn
You are	Tha sibh/ Is sibhse	You will be	Bidh sibh	(that) you be	(gum) bi iad
They are	Tha iad/ Is iadsan	They will be	Bidh iad	(that) they be	(gum) bi iad

In Scottish Gaelic, the past subjunctive of the verb bi 'be' is robh, which is identical to the dependent form of the preterite indicative.

Preterite indicative		Conditional		Past subjunctive	
English	Gaelic	English	Gaelic	English	Gaelic
I was	Bha mi/ Bu mhise	I would be	Bhithinn	(that) I were	(gun) robh mi
Thou wast	Bha thu/ Bu tusa	Thou wouldst be	Bhiodh tu	(that) thou wert	(gun) robh thu
He was	Bha e/ B' e	He would be	Bhiodh e	(that) he were	(gun) robh e
One was	Bhathar	One would be	Bhite	(that) one were	(gun) robhas
We were	Bha sinn/ Bu sinne	We would be	Bhiodh sinn	(that) we were	(gun) robh sinn
You were	Bha sibh/ Bu sibhse	You would be	Bhiodh sibh	(that) you were	(gun) robh sibh
They were	Bha iad/ B' iadsan	They would be	Bhiodh iad	(that) they were	(gun) robh iad

For every other verb in Gaelic, the past subjunctive is identical to the conditional.

Examples:

- Nan robh mi beairteach, shiubhlainn air feadh an t-saoghail. 'If I were rich, I would travel all over the world.'
- Mura dèanainn m' obair-dhachaigh, bhithinn ann an trioblaid. 'If I had not done my homework, I would have been in trouble.'
  - Or: Mura robh mi air m' obair-dhachaigh a dhèanamh, bhithinn (air a bhith) ann an trioblaid.

==== Irish ====
In the Irish language (Gaeilge), the subjunctive is considered an old-fashioned tense for daily speech (except in set phrases) but still appears often in print. Like in Scottish Gaelic (its sister language), the Irish subjunctive conveys the idea of wishing something; it appears in some famous Irish proverbs and blessings.

The subjunctive is normally formed from go (which eclipses and adds n- to a verb beginning with a vowel) together with the subjunctive form of the verb, the subject, and the thing being wished for. For example:

- Go dté tú slán. 'May you be well.' (lit: 'may you go well')
- Go dtuga Dia ciall duit. 'May God give you sense.'
- Go ndéana an Diabhal toirneach de d'anam in Ifreann. 'May the Devil make thunder of your soul in Hell.'
- Go mbeannaí Dia thú. 'May God bless you.'

The subjunctive is generally formed by taking the stem of the verb and adding on the appropriate subjunctive ending depending on broad or slender, and first or second conjugation. For example, to the stem of bog 'to move' is added -a giving as its subjunctive in the first person boga mé:

First conjugation:

mol 'to praise'	mola mé	mola tú	mola sé/sí	molaimid	mola sibh	mola siad
bris 'to break'	brise mé	brise tú	brise sé/sí	brisimid	brise sibh	brise siad

Second conjugation:

beannaigh 'to bless'	beannaí mé	beannaí tú	beannaí sé/sí	beannaímid	beannaí sibh	beannaí siad
bailigh 'to collect'	bailí mé	bailí tú	bailí sé/sí	bailímid	bailí sibh	bailí siad

There is also some irregularity in certain verbs in the subjunctive. The verb bí 'to be' is the most irregular verb in Irish (as in most Indo-European languages):

Present indicative	tá mé/táim	tá tú	tá sé/sí	tá muid/táimid	tá sibh	tá siad
Present subjunctive	raibh mé	raibh tú	raibh sé/sí	rabhaimid	raibh sibh	raibh siad

The Irish phrase go raibh maith agat ('thank you') uses the subjunctive of bí and literally means 'may there be good at-you'.

Some verbs do not follow the conjugation of the subjunctive exactly as conjugated above. These irregularities apply to verbs whose stem already ends in a stressed vowel and thus, due to the rules of Irish orthography and pronunciation, cannot take another. For example:

	Present indicative	Present subjunctive
téigh 'to go'	téann tú	té tú
sáigh 'to stab'	sánn tú	sá tú
luigh 'to lie down'	luíonn tú	luí tú
feoigh 'to decay; wither'	feonn tú	feo tú

Although feoigh doesn't have a síneadh fada (accent), the o in this position is stressed (pronounced as though it is ó) and thus the subjunctive is irregular.

Where the subjunctive is used in English, it may not be used in Irish and another tense might be used instead. For example:

- Dá mba (past/conditional of the copula) mise tusa, dhéanfainn (conditional) staidéar le haghaidh an scrúdaithe amárach. 'If I were (past subjunctive) you, I would study for the exam tomorrow.'
- Is mian liom go raibh (present sub.) tú anseo. 'I wish (that) you were (past sub.) here.'
- Tá sé tábhachtach go roghnóidh (future indicative) sé ar an mbealach ceart. 'It is important that he choose (present sub.) the right way.'
- Nuair a bheidh/bheas (future ind.) tú níos sine, tuigfidh tú. When you're older (present ind.), you'll understand.

Note that in English, the relative pronoun that can be omitted; in Irish, the corresponding go must be retained. Also, in English, the present tense is often used to refer to a future state, whereas in Irish there is less freedom with tenses (i.e. time is more strictly bound to the appropriate tense, present for present, past for past, future for future). In this particular example, you will be older and it is then that you will understand.

=== Indo-Aryan languages ===
==== Hindi-Urdu ====
There are two subjunctive moods in Hindi-Urdu (Hindustani): the regular subjunctive; and the perfective subjunctive, which superficially has the same form as the perfective aspect forms of verbs, but still expresses future events. The perfective is only ever used with if clauses and relative pronouns. In a semantic analysis, this use of the perfective aspect marker would not be considered perfective, since it is more closely related to subjunctive usage. Only the superficial form is identical to that of the perfective.

The regular subjunctive mood can be put in two tenses: present and future. There is another mood, called the contrafactual mood, which serves as both the past subjunctive and the past conditional mood in Hindustani. Hindi-Urdu, apart from the non-aspectual forms (or the simple aspect), has three grammatical aspects (habitual, perfective & progressive). Each aspect can be put in five grammatical moods (indicative, presumptive, subjunctive, contrafactual & imperative). The subjunctive mood can be put in the present tense only for the verb honā 'to be'; for any other verb, only the future sujunctive form exists. Subjunctive mood forms for all three grammatical aspects of Hindustani for the verbs honā 'to be' and karnā 'to do' are shown in the table below.

Subjunctive and Contrafactual Conjugations of honā (to be)
mood		tense	singular						plural	
mood		tense	1P ma͠i		2P tum (Note: The pronouns tum and āp in Hindi-Urdu can be used as both singular and plural pronouns, akin to the English pronoun "you".)		3P yah/ye, vah/vo		1P ham	
mood		tense	1P ma͠i		2P tum		3P yah/ye, vah/vo		2P āp	
mood		tense	1P ma͠i		2P tum		2P tū		3P ye, ve/vo	
mood		tense	♂	♀	♂	♀	♂	♀	♂	♀
subjunctive	regular	present	hū̃		ho		ho		hõ	
subjunctive	regular	future	hoū̃		hoo		hoe		hoẽ	
subjunctive	perfective	future	huā	huī	hue	huī	huā	huī	hue	huī̃
contrafactual		past	hotā	hotī	hote	hotī	hotā	hotī	hote	hotī̃

Subjunctive and Contrafactual Aspectual Forms of karnā (to do)
mood		tense	singular						plural	
mood		tense	1P ma͠i		2P tum		3P yah/ye, vah/vo		1P ham	
mood		tense	1P ma͠i		2P tum		3P yah/ye, vah/vo		2P āp	
mood		tense	1P ma͠i		2P tum		2P tū		3P ye, ve/vo	
mood		tense	♂	♀	♂	♀	♂	♀	♂	♀
HABITUAL ASPECT (Note: Habitual aspect in Hindi-Urdu requires the copula rêhnā (to stay) to form future tense forms, progressive and perfective mood can use rêhnā (to stay) as well to form synonymous future subjunctive forms.)
subjunctive	regular	present	kartā hū̃	kartī hū̃	karte ho	kartī ho	kartā ho	kartī ho	kartā hõ	kartī hõ
subjunctive	regular	future (Note: Perfective aspect in Hindi-Urdu requires the perfective past forms of the copula rêhnā (to stay) to form the perfective (future) subjunctive forms.)	kartā rahū̃	kartī rahū̃	karte raho	kartī raho	kartā rahe	kartī rahe	karte rahẽ	kartī rahẽ
subjunctive	perfective	future	kartā rahā	kartī rahī	karte rahe	kartī rahī	kartā rahā	kartī rahī	karte rahe	kartī rahī̃
contrafactual		past	kartā hotā	kartī hotī	karte hote	kartī hotī	kartā hotā	kartī hotī	karte hote	kartī hotī̃
PERFECTIVE ASPECT
subjunctive	regular	present	kiyā hū̃	kī hū̃	kiye ho	kī ho	kiyā ho	kī ho	kiye hõ	kī hõ
subjunctive	regular	future	kiyā hoū̃	kī hoū̃	kiye hoo	kī hoo	kiyā hoe	kī hoe	kiye hoẽ	kī hoẽ
subjunctive	perfective	future	kiyā rahā	kī rahī	kiye rahe	kī rahī	kiyā rahā	kī rahī	kiye rahe	kī rahī̃
contrafactual		past	kiyā hotā	kī hotī	kiye hote	kī hotī	kiyā hotā	kī hotī	kiye hote	kī hotī̃
PROGRESSIVE ASPECT (Note: Unlike English, in which both the continuous and the progressive aspect have the same -ing form, the progressive aspect of Hindi-Urdu cannot convey the continuous aspect.)
subjunctive	regular	present	kar rahā hū̃	kar rahī hū̃	kar rahe ho	kar rahī ho	kar rahā ho	kar rahī ho	kar rahe hõ	kar rahī hõ
subjunctive	regular	future	kar rahā hoū̃	kar rahī hoū̃	kar rahe hoo	kar rahī hoo	kar rahā hoe	kar rahī hoe	kar rahe hoẽ	kar rahī hoẽ
subjunctive	perfective	future	kar rahā huā	kar rahī huī	kar rahe hue	kar rahī huī	kar rahā hua	kar rahī huī	kar rahe hue	kar rahī huī̃
contrafactual		past	kar rahā hotā	kar rahī hotī	kar rahe hote	kar rahī hotī	kar rahā hotā	kar rahī hotī	kar rahe hote	kar rahī hotī̃

Subjunctive and Contrafactual Conjugations of karnā (to do)
mood		tense	singular						plural	
mood		tense	1P ma͠i		2P tum		3P yah/ye, vah/vo		1P ham	
mood		tense	1P ma͠i		2P tum		3P yah/ye, vah/vo		2P āp	
mood		tense	1P ma͠i		2P tum		2P tū		3P ye, ve/vo	
mood		tense	♂	♀	♂	♀	♂	♀	♂	♀
subjunctive	regular	future	karū̃		karo		kare		karẽ	
subjunctive	perfective	future	kiyā	kī	kiye	kī	kiyā	kī	kiye	kī̃
contrafactual		past	kartā	kartī	karte	kartī	kartā	kartī	karte	kartī̃

			Example Sentence
Subjunctive	Regular	Present	uskī tabiyat sahī ho bas. his/her.GEN health.NOM correct.ADJ be.SBJV.PRS only (I only hope that) his/her health is in good condition.
Subjunctive	Regular	Future	ummīd kar rahī hū̃ ki bole vo kuch use. hope do stay.PTCP be.1P.SG. that tell.SBJV.FUT. he/she.NOM something him/her.DAT; I am hoping he/she tells something to him/her.
Subjunctive	Perfective	Future	ma͠i usse pūchū̃ aur usne nahī̃ batāyā to? I.NOM him/her.INST ask.1P.SBJV.SG and he/she.ERG not tell.SBJV.PFV.FUT then (In the case that) I ask him and he doesn't tell (me) then?
Contrafactual		Past	kāsh usne usī din ye bāt {batā dī hotī.} {I wish} he/she.ERG that.DEM.EMPH day.NOM this.DEM matter.NOM.FEM tell.CONTRA.FEM; I wish he/she had told me about this thing on that day itself.

=== Slavic languages ===
The Slavic languages lost the Proto-Indo-European subjunctive altogether, while the old optative was repurposed as the imperative mood. Some modern Slavic languages have developed a new subjunctive-like construction, although there is no consistent terminology. For example, some authors do not distinguish the subjunctive mood from the optative ("wishing") mood, while others do.

==== Polish ====
The subjunctive mood is formed using the by particle, either alone or forming a single word with the complex conjunctions żeby, iżby, ażeby, aby, and coby. The mood does not have its own morphology, but instead has a rule that the by-containing particle must be placed in front of the dependent clause. Compare:

- Upieram się, że wychodzi. (indicative) 'I insist that he is leaving'
- Upieram się, (że)by wyszedł. (subjunctive) 'I insist that he leave'
- Upieram się, że wyszedłby. (conditional) 'I insist that he would leave'

The subjunctive mood in the dependent clause is obligatory in the case of certain independent clauses. For example, it is incorrect to say *chcę, że to zrobi. The subjunctive mood must be used instead: chcę, by to zrobił.

The subjunctive can never be mistaken with the conditional, despite that in the case of the conditional mood the clitic by and derivatives can move.

- Upieram się, że wtedy by nie wyszedł. (conditional) 'I insist that he would not have left then [at that time]'
- Upieram się, że by wówczas nie wyszedł. (conditional) 'I insist that he would not have left then/[at that time]/[in that case]'
- Myślę, że on by akurat wyszedł. (conditional) 'I think that he would have just left [a moment ago]'
- Myślę, że gdyby wyszedł ... conditional – 'I think that if he would have left ...'

There is no conjunction, which would indicate the subjunctive. In particular, there is no żeby.

Compare to the closely related optative mood, for example the subjunctive nie nalegam, by wysłał list vs the optative oby wysłał list.

==== Bulgarian ====
Modal distinctions in subordinate clauses are expressed not through verb endings, but through the choice of complementizer – че (che) or да (da) (which might both be translated with the relative pronoun 'that'). The verbs remain unchanged. In ordinary sentences, the imperfective aspect is most often used for the indicative, and the perfective for the subjunctive, but any combination is possible, with the corresponding change in meaning. For example, iskam da stanesh (perfective) or iskam da stavash (imperfective) 'I want you to get up'. The latter is more insisting, since the imperfective is the more immediate construction. Thus:

- Indicative (че)
  - знам, че си тук (znam, che si tuk) 'I know that you are here'
- Subjunctive (да)
  - настоявам да си тук (nastoyavam da si tuk) 'I insist that you be here'

== Semitic languages ==
=== Arabic ===
In Classical Arabic, the verb in its imperfect aspect (al-muḍāri‘) has a subjunctive form called the manṣūb form (منصوب). It is distinct from the imperfect indicative in most of its forms: where the indicative has -u, the subjunctive has -a; and where the indicative has -na or -ni, the subjunctive has nothing at all. (The -na ending in the second and third-person plural feminine is different: it marks the gender and number, not the mood, and therefore it is present in both the indicative and subjunctive.)

- Indicative third singular masc. yaktubu 'he writes/is writing/will write' → Subjunctive yaktuba 'he may / should write'
- Indicative third plural masc. yaktubūna 'they write' → Subjunctive yaktubū 'they may write'
- Indicative third plural fem. yaktubna 'they write' → Subjunctive yaktubna 'they may write'

The subjunctive is used in that-clauses, after Arabic an: urīdu an aktuba 'I want to write.' However, in conditional and precative sentences, such as "if he goes" or "let him go", a different mood of the imperfect aspect, the jussive, majzūm, is used.

In many spoken Arabic dialects, there remains a distinction between indicative and subjunctive; however, it is not through a suffix but rather a prefix.

In Levantine Arabic, the indicative has b- while the subjunctive lacks it:

- third sing. masc. huwwe byuktob 'he writes / is writing / will write', versus yuktob 'he may / should write'
- third plural masc. homme byukotbu, versus yukotbu

Egyptian Arabic uses a simple construction that precedes the conjugated verbs with law 'if' or momken 'may'; the following are some examples:

- Law/Momken enti tektebi. 'If /Maybe you write'
- Law/Momken enti katabti. 'If /Maybe you wrote'
- Law/Momken enti konti tektebi. 'If /Maybe you would write'
- Law/Momken enti ḥatektebi. 'If /Maybe you will write'

Tunisian Arabic often precedes the imperfective indicative verb by various conjunctions to create the subjunctive:

- Mē ʕandak ma tekteb. 'You have nothing to write'

Literally: not at.you subj_tool you_write

Ken for wish, hope or opinion:

- Netmanna, ken nʃūfak nējeħ nhār. 'I wish I'd see you successful one day'
- Ken yeʃlēqu. '(I) hope they find out'
- (Men rayi,) Ken temʃi tertēħ. '(In my opinion,) It's better [for your health] to relax'

Taw for a highly expected possibility:

- Abqa hne, taw toxles. 'Stay here (and) you will/could get paid.'

Ra for inevitability (but in most cases it is accompanied with ken in the other clause):

- Ken tkūn ðˤʕīf, rak bēʃ tetʕeb fe ħyētak. 'Once you get weak, you'll suffer in life'

=== Hebrew ===
Final short vowels were elided in Hebrew in prehistoric times, so that the distinction between the Proto-Semitic indicative, subjunctive, and jussive (similar to Classical Arabic forms) had largely been lost, even in Biblical Hebrew. The distinction does remain for some verbal categories, where the original final morphemes effected lasting secondary changes in word-internal syllabic structure and vowel length. These include weak roots with a medial or final vowel, such as yaqūm 'he rises / will rise' versus yaqom 'may he rise' and yihye 'he will be' versus yehi 'may he be', imperfect forms of the hiphil stem, and also generally for first person imperfect forms: אֵשֵׁב (imperfect indicative of 'sit') vs. אֵשְׁבָה (imperfect cohortative=volitive of 'sit'). In modern Hebrew, the situation has been carried even further, with forms like yaqom and yehi becoming non-productive; instead, the future tense (prefix conjugation) is used for the subjunctive, often with the particle she- added to introduce the clause, if it is not already present (similar to French que).

- שיבוא Sheyavo – 'Let him come' or 'May he come' (literally, 'That (he) will come')
- אני רוצה שיבוא Ani rotzeh sheyavo – 'I want him to come' (literally, 'I want that (he) will come')

Biblical subjunctive forms survive in non-productive phrases in such forms as the third-person singular of 'to be' (להיות lihyot, יהי/תהי or יהא/תהא) and 'to live' (לחיות likhyot, יחי/תחי), mostly in a literary register:

- יחי המלך Y'khi ha-melekh – 'Long live the king' (literally, 'Live the-king')
- לו יהי Lu Y'hi – 'Let it be' (literally, 'if it be') (a popular song in Hebrew, by Naomi Shemer)

=== Akkadian ===
Subordinate clauses in Babylonian and Standard Babylonian Akkadian are marked with a -u on verbs ending in a consonant, and with nothing after vocalic endings or after ventive endings. Due to the consonantal structure of semitic languages, and Akkadian sound laws, the addition of the -u might trigger short vowels in the middle of the word to disappear. Assyrian Akkadian uses a more complicated system with both -u and -ni as markers of subordination. The ending -ni was used in the instances where -u could not be used as stated above. During Middle and Neo Assyrian the -ni ending became compulsory on all subordinate verbs, even those that already had the -u, resulting in -ni and -ūni as markers of subordination.

== Uralic languages ==
=== Hungarian ===
This mood in Hungarian is generally used to express polite demands and suggestions. The endings are identical between imperative, conjunctive and subjunctive; it is therefore often called the conjunctive-imperative mood.

Examples:

- Add nekem! 'Give it to me.' (demand)
- Menjünk! 'Let's go.' (suggestion)
- Menjek? 'Shall I go?' (suggestion or question)
- Menj! 'Go!' (demand)

Note that "demand" is nowhere near as rude as it might sound in English. It is a polite but firm request, but not as polite as "would you...".

The characteristic letter in its ending is -j-, and in the definite conjunctive conjugation the endings appear very similar to those of singular possession, with a leading letter -j-.

An unusual feature of the mood's endings is that there exist a short and a long form for the second person singular. The formation of this for regular verbs differs between the indefinite and definite: the indefinite requires just the addition of -j, which differs from the longer ending in that the last two sounds are omitted (-j and not -jél for example in menj above, cf. menjél). The short version of the definite form also drops two letters, but another two. It drops, for example: the -ja- in -jad, leaving just -d, as can be seen in add above (instead of adjad).

There are several groups of exceptions involving verbs that end in -t. The rules for how this letter, and a preceding letter, should change when the subjunctive endings are applied are quite complicated, see the article Hungarian verbs.

As usual, gemination of a final sibilant consonant is demonstrated when a j-initial ending is applied:

mos + -jak gives mossak 'let me wash' (-j- changes to -s-)

When referring to the demands of others, the subjunctive is demonstrated:

kérte, hogy menjek. 'He asked that I go. (He asked me to go.)' Here, 'I go' is in the subjunctive.

== Turkic languages ==
=== Turkish ===
There is no direct one-to-one correspondence between the subjunctive mood in other languages and the verbal moods in Turkish. Depending on the context, the subjunctive in other languages may be expressed in Turkish through the imperative (emir kipi), necessitative (gereklilik kipi), optative (istek kipi), desiderative (dilek kipi), or conditional (şart kipi) moods.

Examples of the optative mood (istek kipi) are:

- gideyim 'Let me go'
- gitsin 'Let him go'
- gidelim 'Let us go'
- gitsinler 'Let them go'.

Suggestions, desires and intentions are expressed with the optative verb. The suffixes -(y)eyim, -(y)elim, and other forms are used to form an optative verb. For example:

- The suffix -(y)eyim/-(y)ayım is the first person singular.
  - ağlamak 'to cry' → ağlayayım 'let me cry'
  - uyumak 'to sleep' → uyuyayım 'let me sleep'.
- The suffix -(y)elim/-(y)alım is the first person plural.
  - Bugün araba sürelim. 'Let's drive a car today.'
  - Bu akşam için kek yapalım. 'Let's make a cake for tonight.'

An example of a conditional mode (şart kipi) is Çalışırsa kazanır 'If he works, he wins. (simple present), he will win (simple future)', çalıştıysa kazanır 'If he has worked, he might win. (simple present)'.

Some examples of the necessitative mood (gereklilik kipi) are:

- Benim gelmem gerek 'I must/have to come'
- Dün toplantıya katılman gerekirdi 'You should have attended the meeting yesterday (but you didn't).'

Some examples of the imperative mode (emir kipi) are:

- siz gelin 'Let you come'
- onlar gelsinler 'Let them come'

Some examples of the desiderative mood (dilek kipi) are:

- Ah! şimdi burada olsaydı 'Oh! If only he were here now'
- Keşke burada olaydı 'I wish he were here.'
- Keşke arabam olsa da otobüse binmesem 'I wish I had a car, so I don't (need to) get on the bus.'
- Keşke arabam olsaydı da otobüse binmeseydim 'I wish I had a car, so I didn't (need to) get on the bus.'
- Keşke arabam olsa o zaman otobüse binmem 'If I had a car, I wouldn't get on the bus.'
- Keşke arabam olsaydı o zaman otobüse binmezdim 'I wish I had a car then I wouldn't get on the bus.'
