= Jan August Hiż =

Major general of the Poland's Crown Army

- Coat of arms: Jeż
- Born: November 25, 1743; Warszawa
- Died: December 22, 1816 (aged 73)
- Family: Hiż
- Consort: Franciszka de Gerault
- Issue: Elżbieta, Aleksander, Jan, Karol, Józef
- Father: Jan Wilhelm Hiż
- Mother: Katarzyna de Mathy

Jan August Hiż (25 November 1743 – 22 December 1816) was a Polish military officer, major general of the Poland's Crown Army.

== Biography ==
He came from a family of professional military of probably French origin.

His grandfather Wilhelm, married to Franciszka de Loupi, was captain of the Crown Guard. His father Jan Wilhelm, married to Katarzyna de Mathy, was a colonel of the Crown Guard. In 1764, Jan Wilhelm Hiż, as one of five members of the Hiż family, received nobility with the coat of arms of Jeż.

Jan August Hiż was married to Franciszka de Gerault and had five children: Elżbieta (who married Jan Fechner), Aleksander (tenant of Głębokie estate in the Radom poviat), Jan (military officer), Karol (military officer) and Józef (military officer and topographer).

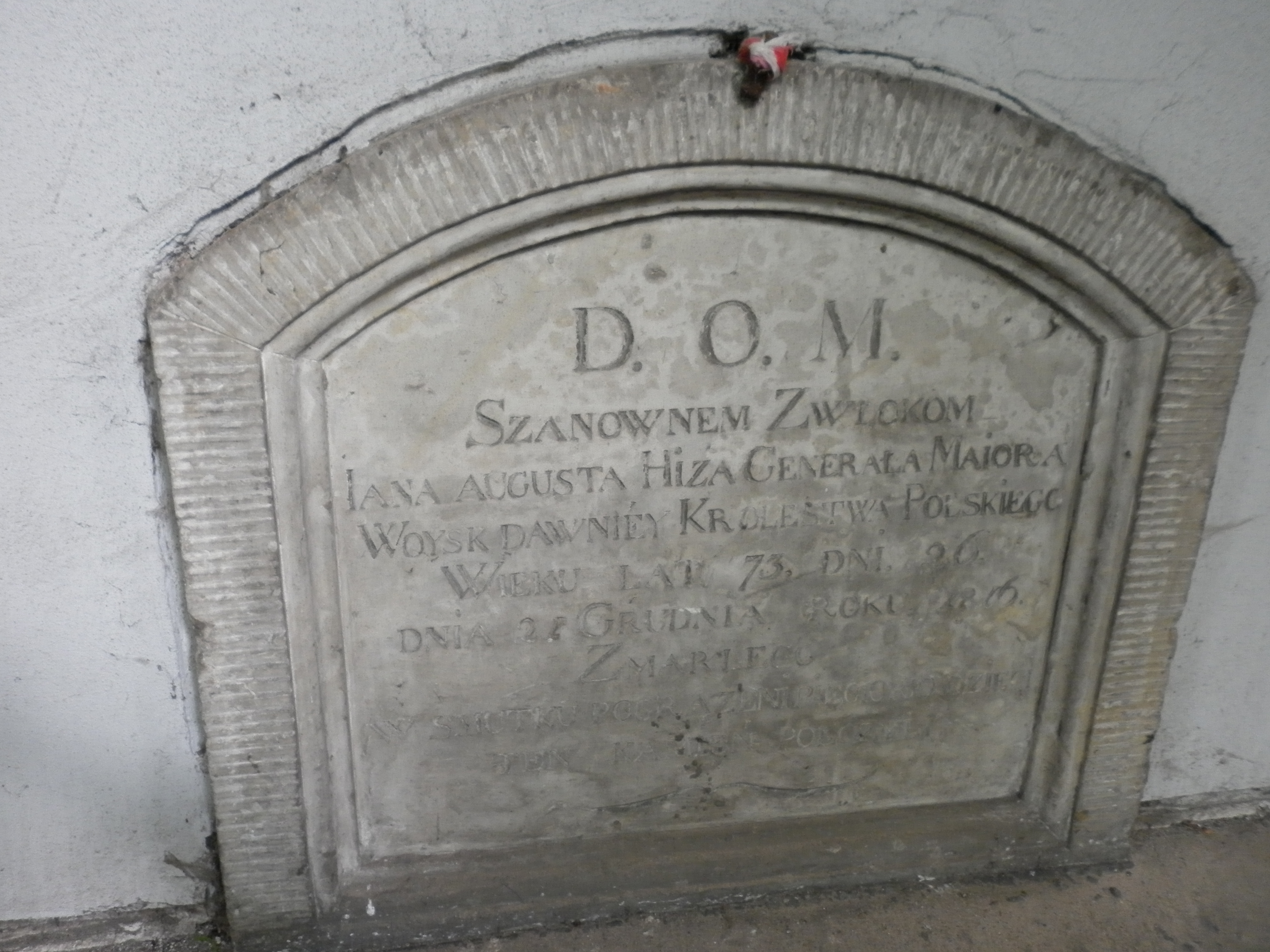
The grave of Jan August Hiż at the Powązki Cemetery in Warsaw.

The general was buried in the catacombs of the Powązki Cemetery in Warsaw. The inscription on the tombstone says: D.O.M. Dear corpse of Jan August Hiż, major-general of the formerly Polish Kingdom, aged 73 days 26, on December 22, 1816. His five children sadly laid this stone.

The descendants of Jan August Hiż held high positions throughout the 19th and 20th centuries. Jan August's great-grandson was poet and journalist Tadeusz Hiż.
