= Jeż coat of arms =

Polish coat of arms

Jeż
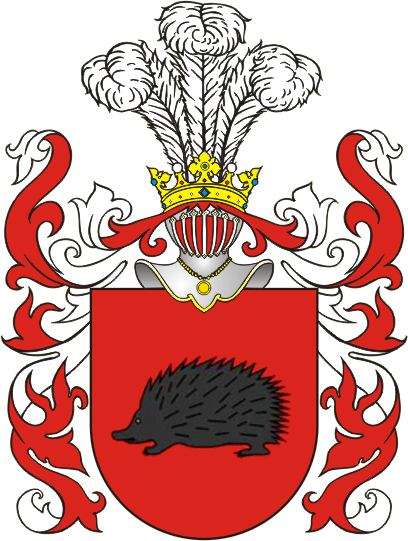
- Earliest mention: 1600s
- Towns: Vilnius
- Families: Gąsiorecki, Hiż, Hyżewicz, Jeż, Lisowski, Lasowski, Sulkiewicz, Wyżewicz

Jeż (Polish for "Hedgehog") is a Polish coat of arms.

== Notable bearers ==
Notable bearers of this coat of arms have included:

- Aleksander Lisowski, commander of Lisowczycy.
- Jan August Hiż

== See also ==
- Polish heraldry
- Heraldic family
- List of Polish nobility coats of arms

== Bibliography ==
- Tadeusz Gajl: Herbarz polski od średniowiecza do XX wieku : ponad 4500 herbów szlacheckich 37 tysięcy nazwisk 55 tysięcy rodów. L&L, 2007. ISBN 978-83-60597-10-1.
- Bartosz Paprocki: Herby rycerstwa polskiego na pięcioro ksiąg rozdzielone, Kraków, 1584.
