= Slifting =

Grammatical construction where embedded clause is preposed

In linguistics, slifting is a grammatical construction in which the embedded clause of a propositional attitude, speech report, or emotive is preposed. For instance the English sentence Nick is a great singer, Sara claims is the slifted variant of Sarah claims Nick is a great singer. The concept was first identified and named by Haj Ross in 1973. Slifting is more restricted than other kinds of preposing. Sentences involving slifting are often referred to as slifting parentheticals since the content of the slifted clause must be at-issue. For instance, the example above is most naturally understood as asserting that Nick is a great singer while parenthetically acknowledging Sara as the source of this information. The examples below show that this interpretation is strong enough to produce infelicity when a preceding question establishes a context where the wrong proposition is at-issue.

1. Q: Why is Freedia not here?
  A: She quit, Sara told me. (slifting)
2. Q: What did Sara tell you?
  A: # She quit, Sara told me. (slifting)
1. Q: Why is Freedia not here?
  A: Sara told me she quit. (non-slifting)
2. Q: What did Sara tell you?
  A: Sara told me she quit. (non-slifting)

Additionally, not all embedding predicates allow slifting.

1. #She quit, Sara doubts.
2. Jame'll be here next week, she emailed me.

Slifted clauses also cannot have an overt complementizer.

1. Q: Why is Freedia not here?
  A: # That she quit, Sara claims. (slifting)
2. That she quit, Sara told me. That she won the lottery, I only found out later. (non-slifting preoposing)

Moreover, interrogative instances of slifting show subject-auxiliary inversion.

1. Will Freedia report our company's crimes to ESMA, Sara wondered. (slifting)
2. Whether Freedia will report our company's crimes to ESMA, I don't know. (non-slifting)

Ross analyzed slifting as the result of a movement rule. However, many subsequent researchers have argued that slifting is fundamentally different from true preposing and that the slifted clause may not be an embedded clause at all. Semantic analyses have been proposed which treat slifting as a kind of evidentiality.

== See also ==
- Evidentiality
- Haj Ross
- Information structure
- Inversion (linguistics)
- Propositional attitude
