= Ignacy Łempicki (general) =

Major General of the Polish Army

- Coat of arms: Junosza
- Family: Łempicki
- Consort: Marianna Hiż
- Issue: Ignacy, Eufemia
- Father: Jan Łempicki
- Mother: Antonina Dudassy

Ignacy Czesław Łempicki (18th century) was a Polish military officer, Major General of Poland's Crown Army, Royal Adjutant General, and Official of the Military Commission.

== Biography ==
He was the son of Jan Łempicki, a colonel in the Crown Army; and Antonina Dudassy, daughter of Gabryel Dudassy, a Hungarian infantry colonel.

Ignacy Czesław Łempicki was a major in the infantry regiment in 1766. He was elected a member of the 1767 Sejm as a representative of the Zakroczym Land. Russian minister plenipotentiary Nikolai Vasilyeich Repnin, in an attachment to the message to the President of the Foreign Affairs College of the Russian Empire Nikita Ivanovich Panin of October 2, 1767, described Łempicki as the MP responsible for the implementation of Russian plans at the 1767 Sejm for which the king is responsible.

He was married to Marianna Hiż, the daughter of Jan Wilhelm Hiż, the colonel of the Crown Guard. They had a son Ignacy (born 1766) and a daughter Eufemia.
