= Comma =

Punctuation mark (,)

,o

Comma
- U+002C , COMMA (&comma;)
、	،	◌̦
Ideographic comma (CJK)	Arabic comma	combining comma below

The comma , is a punctuation mark that appears in several variants in different languages. Some typefaces render it as a small line, slightly curved or straight, but inclined from the vertical; others give it the appearance of a miniature filled-in figure 9 placed on the baseline. In many typefaces it is the same shape as an apostrophe or single closing quotation mark ’.

The comma is used in many contexts and languages, mainly to separate parts of a sentence such as clauses, and items in lists mainly when there are three or more items listed. The word comma comes from the Greek κόμμα (kómma), which originally meant a cut-off piece, specifically in grammar, a short clause.

A comma-shaped mark is used as a diacritic in several writing systems and is considered distinct from the cedilla. In Byzantine and modern copies of Ancient Greek, the "rough" and "smooth breathings" (ἁ, ἀ) appear above the letter. In Latvian, Romanian, and Livonian, the comma diacritic appears below the letter, as in ș.

In this article, ⟨x⟩ denotes a grapheme (writing) and /x/ denotes a phoneme (sound).

== History ==
The development of punctuation is much more recent than the alphabet.

In the 3rd century BC, Aristophanes of Byzantium invented a system of single dots (théseis) at varying levels, which separated verses and indicated the amount of breath needed to complete each fragment of the text when reading aloud. The different lengths were signified by a dot at the bottom, middle, or top of the line. For a short passage, a komma in the form of a dot ⟨·⟩ was placed mid-level. This is the origin of the concept of a comma, although the name came to be used for the mark itself instead of the clause it separated.

The mark used today is descended from a /, a diagonal slash known as virgula suspensiva, used from the 13th to 17th centuries to represent a pause. The modern comma was first used by Aldus Manutius.

== Uses in English ==
In general, the comma shows that the words immediately before the comma are less closely or exclusively linked grammatically to those immediately after the comma than they might be otherwise. The comma performs a number of functions in English writing. It is used in generally similar ways in other languages, particularly European ones, although the rules on comma usage – and their rigidity – vary from language to language.

=== List separator and the serial (Oxford) comma ===
Commas are placed between items in lists, as in They own a cat, a dog, two rabbits, and seven mice.

Whether the final conjunction, most frequently and, should be preceded by a comma, called the serial comma, is one of the most disputed linguistic or stylistic questions in English:

- They served apples, peaches, and bananas. (serial comma used)
- They served apples, peaches and bananas. (serial comma omitted)

The serial comma is used much more often, usually routinely, in the United States. A majority of American style guides mandate its use, including The Chicago Manual of Style, Strunk and White's classic The Elements of Style, and the U.S. Government Publishing Office's Style Manual. Conversely, the AP Stylebook for journalistic writing advises against it.

The serial comma is also known as the Oxford comma, Harvard comma, or series comma. Although less common in British English, its usage occurs within both American and British English. It is called the Oxford comma because of its long history of use by Oxford University Press.

According to New Hart's Rules, "house style will dictate" whether to use the serial comma. "The general rule is that one style or the other should be used consistently." No association with region or dialect is suggested, other than that its use has been strongly advocated by Oxford University Press. Its use is preferred by Fowler's Modern English Usage. It is recommended by the United States Government Printing Office and Harvard University Press.

Use of a comma may prevent ambiguity:

- The sentence I spoke to the boys, Sam and Tom could mean either I spoke to the boys and Sam and Tom (I spoke to more than three people) or I spoke to the boys, who are Sam and Tom (I spoke to two people);
- I spoke to the boys, Sam, and Tom – must be the boys and Sam and Tom (I spoke to more than three people).

The serial comma does not eliminate all confusion. Consider the following sentence:

- I thank my mother, Anne Smith, and Thomas. This could mean either my mother and Anne Smith and Thomas (three people) or my mother, who is Anne Smith; and Thomas (two people). This sentence might be recast as "my mother (Anne Smith) and Thomas" for clarity.
- I thank my mother, Anne Smith and Thomas. Because the comma after "mother" is conventionally used to prepare the reader for an appositive phrase – that is, a renaming of or further information about a noun – this construction formally suggests that my mother's name is "Anne Smith and Thomas". Because that is implausible, it is relatively clear that the construction refers to two separate people. Compare "I thank my friend, Smith and Wesson", in which the ambiguity is obvious to those who recognise Smith and Wesson as a business name.

As a rule of thumb, The Guardian Style Guide suggests that straightforward lists (he ate ham, eggs and chips) do not need a comma before the final "and", but sometimes it can help the reader (he ate cereal, kippers, bacon, eggs, toast and marmalade, and tea). The Chicago Manual of Style and other academic writing guides require the serial comma: all lists must have a comma before the "and" prefacing the last item in a series.

If the individual items of a list are long, complex, affixed with description, or themselves contain commas, semicolons may be preferred as separators, and the list may be introduced with a colon.

In news headlines, a comma might replace the word "and", even if there are only two items, in order to save space, as in this headline from Reuters:

- Trump, Macron engage in a little handshake diplomacy.

=== Separation of clauses ===
Commas are often used to separate clauses. In English, a comma is often used to separate a dependent clause from the independent clause if the dependent clause comes first: After I fed the cat, I brushed my clothes. (Compare this with I brushed my clothes after I fed the cat.) A relative clause takes commas if it is non-restrictive, as in I cut down all the trees, which were over six feet tall. (Without the comma, this would mean that only the trees more than six feet tall were cut down.) Some style guides prescribe that two independent clauses joined by a coordinating conjunction (for, and, nor, but, or, yet, so) must be separated by a comma placed before the conjunction. In the following sentences, where the second clause is independent (because it can stand alone as a sentence), the comma is considered by those guides to be necessary:

- Mary walked to the party, but she was unable to walk home.
- Designer clothes are silly, and I can't afford them anyway.
- Don't push that button, or twelve tons of high explosives will go off right under our feet!

In the following sentences, where the second half of the sentence is a dependent clause (because it does not contain an explicit subject), those guides prescribe that the comma be omitted:

- Mary walked to the party but was unable to walk home.
- I think designer clothes are silly and can't afford them anyway.

However, such guides permit the comma to be omitted if the second independent clause is very short, typically when the second independent clause is an imperative, as in:

- Sit down and shut up.

The above guidance is not universally accepted or applied. Long coordinate clauses, particularly when separated by "but", are often separated by commas:

- She had very little to live on, but would never have dreamed of taking what was not hers.

The joining of two independent sentences with a comma and no conjunction (as in "It is nearly half past five, we cannot reach town before dark.") is known as a comma splice and is sometimes considered an error in English; in most cases a semicolon should be used instead. A comma splice should not be confused, though, with the literary device called asyndeton, in which coordinating conjunctions are purposely omitted for a specific stylistic effect.

A much debated comma is the one in the Second Amendment to the United States Constitution, which says "A well regulated Militia being necessary to the security of a free State, the right of the people to keep and bear Arms, shall not be infringed." but ratified by several states as "A well regulated Militia being necessary to the security of a free State, the right of the people to keep and bear Arms shall not be infringed." which has caused much debate on its interpretation.

=== Certain adverbs ===
Commas are always used to set off certain adverbs at the beginning of a sentence, including however, in fact, therefore, nevertheless, moreover, furthermore, and still.

- Therefore, a comma would be appropriate in this sentence.
- Nevertheless, I will not use one.

If these adverbs appear in the middle of a sentence, they are followed and preceded by a comma. As in the second of the two examples below, if a semicolon separates the two sentences and the second sentence starts with an adverb, this adverb is preceded by a semicolon and followed by a comma.

- In this sentence, furthermore, commas would also be called for.
- This sentence is a bit different; however, a comma is necessary as well.

Using commas to offset certain adverbs is optional, including then, so, yet, instead, and too (meaning also).

- So, that's it for this rule. or
- So that's it for this rule.
- A comma would be appropriate in this sentence, too. or
- A comma would be appropriate in this sentence too.

=== Parenthetical phrases ===
Commas are often used to enclose parenthetical words and phrases within a sentence (i.e., information that is not essential to the meaning of the sentence). Such phrases are both preceded and followed by a comma, unless that would result in a doubling of punctuation marks or the parenthetical is at the start or end of the sentence. The following are examples of types of parenthetical phrases:

- Introductory phrase: Once upon a time, my father ate a muffin.
- Interjection: My father ate the muffin, gosh darn it!
- Aside: My father, if you don't mind me telling you this, ate the muffin.
- Appositive: My father, a jaded and bitter man, ate the muffin.
- Absolute phrase: My father, his eyes flashing with rage, ate the muffin.
- Free modifier: My father, chewing with unbridled fury, ate the muffin.
- Resumptive modifier: My father ate the muffin, a muffin which no man had yet chewed.
- Summative modifier: My father ate the muffin, a feat which no man had attempted.

The parenthesization of phrases may change the connotation, reducing or eliminating ambiguity. In the following example, the thing in the first sentence that is relaxing is the cool day, whereas in the second sentence, it is the walk since the introduction of commas makes "on a cool day" parenthetical:

They took a walk on a cool day that was relaxing.

They took a walk, on a cool day, that was relaxing.

As more phrases are introduced, ambiguity accumulates, but when commas separate each phrase, the phrases clearly become modifiers of just one thing. In the second sentence below, that thing is the walk:

They took a walk in the park on a cool day that was relaxing.

They took a walk, in the park, on a cool day, that was relaxing.

=== Between adjectives ===
A comma is used to separate coordinate adjectives (i.e., adjectives that directly and equally modify the following noun). Adjectives are considered coordinate if the meaning would be the same if their order were reversed or if and were placed between them. For example:

- The dull, incessant droning but the cute little cottage.
- The devious lazy red frog suggests there are lazy red frogs (one of which is devious), while the devious, lazy red frog does not carry this connotation.

=== Before quotations ===
Some writers precede quoted material that is the grammatical object of an active verb of speaking or writing with a comma, as in, "Mr. Kershner says, 'You should know how to use a comma.'" Quotations that follow and support an assertion are often preceded by a colon rather than a comma.

Other writers do not put a comma before quotations unless one would occur anyway. Thus, they would write "Mr. Kershner says 'You should know how to use a comma.'"

=== In dates ===
==== Month day, year ====
When a date is written as a month followed by a day followed by a year, a comma separates the day from the year: December 19, 1941. This style is common in American English. The comma is used to avoid confusing consecutive numbers: December 19 1941. Most style manuals, including The Chicago Manual of Style and the AP Stylebook, also recommend that the year be treated as a parenthetical, requiring a second comma after it: "Feb. 14, 1987, was the target date."

If just the month and year are given, no commas are used: "Her daughter may return in June 2009 for the reunion."

==== Day month year ====
When the day precedes the month, the month name separates the numeric day and year, so commas are not necessary to separate them: "The Raid on Alexandria was carried out on 19 December 1941."

=== In geographical names ===
Commas are used to separate parts of geographical references, such as city and state (Dallas, Texas) or city and country (Kampala, Uganda). Additionally, most style manuals, including The Chicago Manual of Style and the AP Stylebook, recommend that the second element be treated as a parenthetical, requiring a second comma after: "The plane landed in Kampala, Uganda, that evening."

The United States Postal Service and Royal Mail recommend leaving out punctuation when writing addresses on actual letters and packages, as the marks hinder optical character recognition. Canada Post has similar guidelines, making only very limited use of hyphens.

=== In mathematics ===
Similar to the case in natural languages, commas are often used to delineate the boundary between multiple mathematical objects in a list (e.g., $(3, 5, 12)$). Commas are also used to indicate the comma derivative of a tensor.

=== In numbers ===
In representing large numbers, from the right side to the left, English texts usually use commas to separate each group of three digits in front of the decimal. This is almost always done for numbers of six or more digits, and often for four or five digits but not in front of the number itself. However, in much of Europe, Southern Africa and Latin America, periods or spaces are used instead; the comma is used as a decimal separator, equivalent to the use in English of the decimal point. In India, the groups are two digits, except for the rightmost group, which is of three digits. In some styles, the comma may not be used for this purpose at all (e.g. in the SI writing style); a space may be used to separate groups of three digits instead.

=== In names ===
Commas are used when rewriting names in lexical name order to present the surname first, generally in instances of alphabetization by surname: Smith, John. They are also used before many titles that follow a name: John Smith, Ph.D.

It can also be used in regnal names followed by their occupation: Louis XIII, king of France and Navarre.

Similarly in lists that are presented with an inversion: socks, green: 3 pairs; socks, red: 2 pairs; tie, regimental: 1.

=== Ellipsis ===
Commas may be used to indicate that a word, or a group of words, has been omitted, as in The cat was white; the dog, brown. (Here the comma replaces was.)

=== Vocative ===
Commas are placed before, after, or around a noun or pronoun used independently in speaking to some person, place, or thing:

- I hope, John, that you will read this.

=== Between the subject and predicate ===
In his 1785 essay An Essay on Punctuation, Joseph Robertson advocated a comma between the subject and predicate of long sentences for clarity; however, this usage is regarded as an error in modern times.

- The good taste of the present age, has not allowed us to neglect the cultivation of the English language.
- Whoever is capable of forgetting a benefit, is an enemy to society.

=== Differences between American and British usage in placement of commas and quotation marks ===
The comma and the quotation mark can be paired in several ways.

In Great Britain and many other parts of the world, punctuation is usually placed within quotation marks only if it is part of what is being quoted or referred to:

- My mother gave me the nickname "Bobby Bobby Bob Bob Boy", which really made me angry.

In American English, the comma was commonly included inside a quotation mark:

- My mother gave me the nickname "Bobby Bobby Bob Bob Boy," which really made me angry.

During the Second World War, the British carried the comma over into abbreviations. Specifically, "Special Operations, Executive" was written "S.O.,E.". Nowadays, even the full stops are frequently discarded in British usage.

== Languages other than English ==
=== Western Europe ===
Western European languages like German, French, Italian, Spanish, and Portuguese use the same comma as English, with similar spacing, though usage may be somewhat different. For instance, in Standard German, subordinate clauses are always preceded by commas.

=== Comma variants ===
The basic comma is defined in Unicode as U+002C , COMMA (&comma;), and many variants by typography or language are also defined.

Character	Unicode point	Unicode name	Notes
,	U+002C	COMMA	Prose in European languages Decimal separator in Continental Europe, Brazil, and most other Latin American countries
،	U+060C	ARABIC COMMA	Used in all languages using Arabic alphabet Also used in other languages, including Syriac and Thaana
⸲	U+2E32	TURNED COMMA	Palaeotype transliteration symbol – indicates nasalization
⸴	U+2E34	RAISED COMMA	
⹁	U+2E41	REVERSED COMMA	Used in Sindhi, among other languages
⹉	U+2E49	DOUBLE STACKED COMMA	Used in the Eastern Orthodox liturgical book Typikon
、	U+3001	IDEOGRAPHIC COMMA	Used in Chinese and Japanese writing systems
︐	U+FE10	PRESENTATION FORM FOR VERTICAL COMMA	Used in vertical writing
︑	U+FE11	PRESENTATION FORM FOR VERTICAL IDEOGRAPHIC COMMA	Used in vertical writing
﹐	U+FE50	SMALL COMMA	
﹑	U+FE51	SMALL IDEOGRAPHIC COMMA	
，	U+FF0C	FULLWIDTH COMMA	
､	U+FF64	HALFWIDTH IDEOGRAPHIC COMMA	

Some languages use a completely different sort of character for the purpose of the comma.

Character	Unicode point	Unicode name	Notes
·	U+00B7	MIDDLE DOT	Used as a comma in Georgian
∘	U+2218	RING OPERATOR	Used as a comma in Malayalam
՝	U+055D	ARMENIAN COMMA	
߸	U+07F8	NKO COMMA	
፣	U+1363	ETHIOPIC COMMA	
᠂	U+1802	MONGOLIAN COMMA	
᠈	U+1808	MONGOLIAN MANCHU COMMA	
⹌	U+2E4C	MEDIEVAL COMMA	
꓾	U+A4FE	LISU PUNCTUATION COMMA	
꘍	U+A60D	VAI COMMA	
꛵	U+A6F5	BAMUM COMMA	
𑑍	U+1144D	NEWA COMMA	
𑑚	U+1145A	NEWA DOUBLE COMMA	
𖺗	U+16E97	MEDEFAIDRIN COMMA	
𝪇	U+1DA87	SIGNWRITING COMMA	

There are also a number of comma-like diacritics with "COMMA" in their Unicode names that are not intended for use as punctuation. A comma-like low quotation mark is also available (shown below; corresponding sets of raised single quotation marks and double-quotation marks are not shown).

Character	Unicode point	Unicode name	Notes
ʻ	U+02BB	MODIFIER LETTER TURNED COMMA	Used as ʻokina in Hawaiian
ʽ	U+02BD	MODIFIER LETTER REVERSED COMMA	Indicates weak aspiration
‍̒	U+0312	COMBINING TURNED COMMA ABOVE	Latvian diacritic cedilla above
‍̓	U+0313	COMBINING COMMA ABOVE	Greek psili (smooth breathing mark)
‍̔	U+0314	COMBINING REVERSED COMMA ABOVE	Greek dasia (rough breathing mark)
‍̕	U+0315	COMBINING COMMA ABOVE RIGHT	
‍̦	U+0326	COMBINING COMMA BELOW	Diacritical mark in Romanian, Latvian, Livonian
‍᫰	U+1AF0	COMBINING DOUBLE COMMA ABOVE	Tone diacritic
‚	U+201A	SINGLE LOW-9 QUOTATION MARK	Opening single quotation mark in some languages

There are various other Unicode characters that include commas or comma-like figures with other characters or marks, that are not shown in these tables.

=== Greece ===
Modern Greek uses the same Unicode comma for its kómma (κόμμα) and it is officially romanized as a Latin comma, but it has additional roles owing to its conflation with the former hypodiastole, a curved interpunct used to disambiguate certain homonyms. As such, the comma functions as a silent letter in a handful of Greek words, principally distinguishing ό,τι (ó,ti, 'whatever') from ότι (óti, 'that').

=== East Asia ===
The enumeration or ideographic comma (U+3001 、 IDEOGRAPHIC COMMA) is used in Chinese, Japanese punctuation, and somewhat in Korean punctuation. In China and Korea, this comma (顿号; 頓號; dùnhào) is usually only used to separate items in lists, while it is the more common form of comma in Japan (読点, tōten, lit. 'clause mark').

In documents that mix Japanese and Latin scripts, the full-width comma (U+FF0C ， FULLWIDTH COMMA) is used; this is the standard form of comma (逗号; 逗號) in China. Since East Asian typography permits commas to join independent clauses dealing with similar topics or lines of thought, commas may be used in ways that would be considered comma splices in English.

Korean punctuation uses both commas and interpuncts for lists.

In Unicode 5.2.0, "numbers with commas" (U+1F101 🄁 DIGIT ZERO COMMA through U+1F10A 🄊 DIGIT NINE COMMA) were added to the Enclosed Alphanumeric Supplement block for compatibility with the ARIB STD B24 character set.

=== West Asia ===
The comma in the Arabic script used by languages including Arabic, Urdu, and Persian, is "upside-down" ⟨،⟩ (U+060C ، ARABIC COMMA), in order to distinguish it from the Arabic diacritic ḍammah ⟨ُ⟩ representing the vowel /u/, which is similarly shaped. In Arabic texts, the Western-styled comma (٫) is used as a decimal point.

Hebrew script is also written from right to left. However, Hebrew punctuation includes only a regular comma ⟨,⟩.

=== South Asia ===
Reversed comma (U+2E41 ⹁ REVERSED COMMA) is used in Sindhi when written in Arabic script. It is distinct from the standard Arabic comma.

Dravidian languages such as Tamil, Telugu, Kannada, and Malayalam also use the punctuation mark in similar usage to that of European languages with similar spacing.

== Computing ==
In the common character encoding systems Unicode and ASCII, character 44 (0x2C) corresponds to the comma symbol. The HTML numeric character reference is &#44;.

In many computer languages commas are used as a field delimiter to separate arguments to a function, to separate elements in a list, and to perform data designation on multiple variables at once.

In the C programming language the comma symbol is an operator which evaluates its first argument (which may have side-effects) and then returns the value of its evaluated second argument. This is useful in for statements and macros.

In Smalltalk and APL, the comma operator is used to concatenate collections, including strings. In APL, it is also used monadically to rearrange the items of an array into a list.

In Prolog, the comma is used to denote Logical Conjunction ("and").

The comma-separated values (CSV) format is very commonly used in exchanging text data between database and spreadsheet formats.

== Diacritical usage ==
◌̦ ◌̓o

Combining comma

In Unicode
- U+0313 ◌̓ COMBINING COMMA ABOVE; U+0314 ◌̔ COMBINING REVERSED COMMA ABOVE; U+0315 ◌̕ COMBINING COMMA ABOVE RIGHT; U+0326 ◌̦ COMBINING COMMA BELOW

ʻ ʽo

Modifier comma

In Unicode
- U+02BB ʻ MODIFIER LETTER TURNED COMMA; U+02BD ʽ MODIFIER LETTER REVERSED COMMA

The comma is used as a diacritic mark in Romanian under ⟨s⟩ (⟨Ș⟩, ⟨ș⟩), and under ⟨t⟩ (⟨Ț⟩, ⟨ț⟩). A cedilla is occasionally used instead of it, but this is technically incorrect. The symbol ⟨d̦⟩ ('d with comma below') was used as part of the Romanian transitional alphabet (19th century) to indicate the sounds denoted by the Latin letter ⟨z⟩ or letters ⟨dz⟩, where derived from a Cyrillic ѕ (⟨ѕ⟩, /dz/). The comma and the cedilla are both derivative of ⟨ʒ⟩ (a small cursive ⟨z⟩) placed below the letter. From this standpoint alone, ⟨ș⟩, ⟨ț⟩, and ⟨d̦⟩ could potentially be regarded as stand-ins for /sz/, /tz/, and /dz/ respectively.

In Latvian, the comma is used on the letters ⟨ģ⟩, ⟨ķ⟩, ⟨ļ⟩, ⟨ņ⟩, and historically also ⟨ŗ⟩, to indicate palatalization. Because the lowercase letter ⟨g⟩ has a descender, the comma is rotated 180° and placed over the letter. Although their Adobe glyph names are 'letter with comma', their names in the Unicode Standard are 'letter with a cedilla'. They were introduced to the Unicode standard before 1992 and, per Unicode Consortium policy, their names cannot be altered. In the late 1920s and 1930s, the Latgalian orthography used in Siberia used additional letters with comma: ⟨c̦⟩, ⟨d̦⟩, ⟨m̦⟩, ⟨p̦⟩, ⟨ș⟩, ⟨ț⟩, ⟨v̦⟩, ⟨z̦⟩.

In Livonian, whose alphabet is based on a mixture of Latvian and Estonian alphabets, the comma is used on the letters ⟨ḑ⟩, ⟨ļ⟩, ⟨ņ⟩, ⟨ŗ⟩, ⟨ț⟩ to indicate palatalization in the same fashion as Latvian, except that Livonian uses ⟨ḑ⟩ and ⟨ț⟩ to represent the same palatal plosive phonemes which Latvian writes as ⟨ģ⟩ and ⟨ķ⟩ respectively.

In Czech and Slovak, the diacritic in the characters ⟨ď⟩, ⟨ť⟩, and ⟨ľ⟩ resembles a superscript comma, but it is used instead of a caron because the letter has an ascender. Other ascender letters with carons, such as letters ⟨ȟ⟩ (used in Finnish Romani and Lakota) and ⟨ǩ⟩ (used in Skolt Sami), did not modify their carons to superscript commas.

In 16th-century Guatemala, the archaic letter cuatrillo with a comma (⟨Ꜯ⟩ and ⟨ꜯ⟩) was used to write Mayan languages.

== See also ==
- Copy editing
- English punctuation
- Latin-script alphabet
- List of typographical symbols and punctuation marks
- Ogonek
- Part of speech
- Sentence clause structure
- Traditional grammar

=== Related history ===
- Global spread of the printing press
- History of printing in East Asia
- History of sentence spacing
- History of Western typography
