= Conjunct =

Semantic or grammatical clustering of words or expressions in linguistic analysis

In linguistics, a conjunct has two distinct forms:

- A conjunct can be a conjunctive adverb; an adverb that adds informational content that is not considered propositional (or at least essential) from a subsequent sentence in a discourse to a previous sentence, linking them together. For example:
  - It was raining. Therefore, we didn’t go swimming.
  - It was sunny. However, we stayed inside.
  - You are such a dork. Still, I love you from the bottom of my heart.
- A conjunct can also be a conjoin; a word, phrase, or clause that is conjoined using coordination to form coordinate structures by means of a coordinating conjunction, which can be coordinating, subordinating or correlative. For example:
  - [Gretchen and her daughter] bought [motor oil, spark plugs, and dynamite].
  - Take two of these and call me in the morning.

== Semantic functions ==
=== Conjunctive adverbs ===
English conjunctive adverbs often have the following functions:

- Listing (indicating that what follows is a list of propositions):

To begin with, I have to tell you that I'm most displeased with your performance in the show. I also think you did a bad job painting the house. You're a lousy cook. You smell. Your hat is ... etc.

- Enumerative (indicating items on a list of propositions):

First, we have to buy bread. Second, we need to take the car to the garage. Third, we have to call your dentist and make an appointment.

- Additive (indicating that the content of the sentence is in addition to the preceding one):

He has no money. In addition, he has no means of getting any.

- Summative (summing up, or concluding, on the preceding sentence(s)):

A is B. A is C. To sum up, A is several things.

- Appositive (rephrasing the preceding sentence):

Music is appreciated in France. In other words, the French love music.

- Resultative/inferential (indicating that the content of the sentence is a result of the events expressed in the preceding sentence):

Miss Gold lost her job. She, therefore, had no money.

- Antithetic (indicating that the content of the sentence is in contrast to the content of the preceding sentence):

It is said that water flows up hill. On the contrary, it flows downhill

- Concessive (indicating that the content of the sentence "exists" despite the content in the preceding sentence):

It is very cold. I went for my morning walk, however.

- Temporal (indicating temporal relation between the content of the sentence and the preceding sentence):

I had lunch. Meanwhile, my wife had her hair cut.

== See also ==
- Disjunct
