= English coordinators =

Coordinators in the English language

English coordinators (also known as coordinating conjunctions) are conjunctions that connect words, phrases, or clauses with equal syntactic importance. The primary coordinators in English are and, but, or, and nor.

Syntactically, they appear between the elements they connect, and semantically, they express additive, contrastive, or alternative relationships between those elements.

== Terminology and membership ==
Matthews defines coordinator as "a word, etc. which links syntactic units standing in a relation of coordination." Most dictionaries and many traditional grammar books use the term coordinating conjunction for this group of words.

=== Central coordinators ===
The primary coordinators include and, but, or, and nor.

==== And ====
And is a coordinator used to connect elements that have an additive relationship, such as I bought apples and oranges or He worked hard and achieved success.

==== But ====
But is a coordinator used to connect elements that have a contrastive relationship, such as She is young but wise or He tried his best but failed.

==== Or ====
Or is a coordinator used to connect elements that represent alternatives or choices, such as You can have tea or coffee or We can go to the beach or stay at home.

==== Nor ====
Nor is a coordinator used to connect elements that express negative alternatives, such as I don't like apples, nor do I like oranges. It is often used in combination with neither, as in Neither John nor Jane is attending the party.

=== Marginal coordinators ===
Marginal coordinators are coordinators that do not share all the properties of the central coordinators. These include so, yet, as well as, slash, and plus.

==== So ====
So is a coordinator used to connect elements providing reasons, such as She was tired, so she went to bed early. Unlike the core coordinators, so connects clauses, but not individual words. For example, she was full so happy is questionable.

==== Yet ====
Yet is a coordinator used to connect elements that have a contrastive relationship, often expressing unexpected results or situations, such as He is a millionaire, yet he lives in a small house.

==== As well as ====
As well as is a marginal coordinator used to connect elements with an additive relationship, similar to and. For example, She isn't a songwriter as well as a singer.

==== Slash ====
Slash (represented by the symbol '/') is an informal coordinator used in writing to connect alternatives, similar to or. It is more common in informal contexts and digital communication, for example, Please bring your own pen/pencil.

==== Plus ====
Plus is a marginal coordinator used to connect elements with an additive relationship, similar to and. It is often used in the context of numbers or quantities, but can also be used more generally. For example, here plus joins two clauses: There were ten people at the party, plus a few latecomers.

== Coordinate structures and the Coordinate Structure Constraint ==
Coordinate structures are created when two or more elements are connected by a coordinator. These structures can involve words, phrases, or clauses. For example, "apples and oranges" is a coordinate structure consisting of two noun phrases, while "She likes apples and he likes oranges" is a coordinate structure consisting of two clauses.

=== Non-headedness ===
Unlike most phrases, coordinations are not headed. An adjective phrase, for instance, has a head adjective along with any possible dependents. In the adjective phrase very happy about it, for instance, happy is the head, very is a modifier and about it is a complement. The modifier and the complement depend on the head. In a coordination, though, the coordinated elements are equal in status, and so neither is the head. Similarly, the coordinator is only a subordinate element, not the head of the coordination.

=== Coordinate structure constraint ===
A well-known constraint on coordinate structures is the Coordinate Structure Constraint, which states that extraction from one conjunct of a coordinate structure is not allowed. This constraint can be seen in the ungrammaticality of sentences like *What did John buy apples and? (where the asterisk indicates ungrammaticality) as opposed to the grammatical sentence What did John buy?

== Coordinators vs other categories ==
=== Coordinators vs conjunctions ===
Coordinators are a subset of conjunctions, a broader category that also includes subordinators. While coordinators connect elements of equal syntactic importance, subordinators mark clauses as subordinate. Both coordinators and subordinators function to connect elements within a sentence, but they do so with different syntactic and semantic roles.

=== Coordinators vs subordinators ===
Coordinators differ from subordinators in that they connect elements of equal syntactic importance, while subordinators mark clauses as subordinate. Coordinators appear between the elements they connect, whereas subordinators typically appear immediately before the subordinate element, though not necessarily after the main clause. Furthermore, coordinators express relationships between the connected elements, while subordinators are often semantically empty or functional.

For example, in the sentence "She likes apples and oranges", the coordinator and connects two elements (apples and oranges) of equal importance with a cumulative sense, and in "He asked for apple or orange juice", or connects with an alternative sense. In contrast, in the sentence "She knew that he was lying", the subordinator that marks the clause "he was lying" as subordinate to the main clause "She knew" but imparts no semantic sense: "She knew he was lying" has the same meaning.

=== Coordinators vs prepositions ===
Coordinators and prepositions are both types of function words that serve to connect elements within a sentence. They share some similarities but also have important differences. Both coordinators and prepositions are used to express relationships between elements in a sentence, and they both belong to closed classes of words, meaning that their numbers are relatively fixed and new members are rarely added. Nevertheless, coordinators connect elements of equal syntactic importance, such as words, phrases, or clauses, while prepositions typically introduce phrases that function as modifiers or complements to other elements in the sentence. Coordinators appear between the elements they connect, whereas prepositions usually appear immediately before the element they introduce (e.g., a noun phrase). Coordinators often express logical relationships between the connected elements, such as addition, contrast, or alternatives (e.g., and, but, or). Prepositions, on the other hand, usually express spatial, temporal, or other semantic relationships (e.g., in, on, during).
