= Polysyndeton =

Use of repeated conjunctions for rhythmic effect

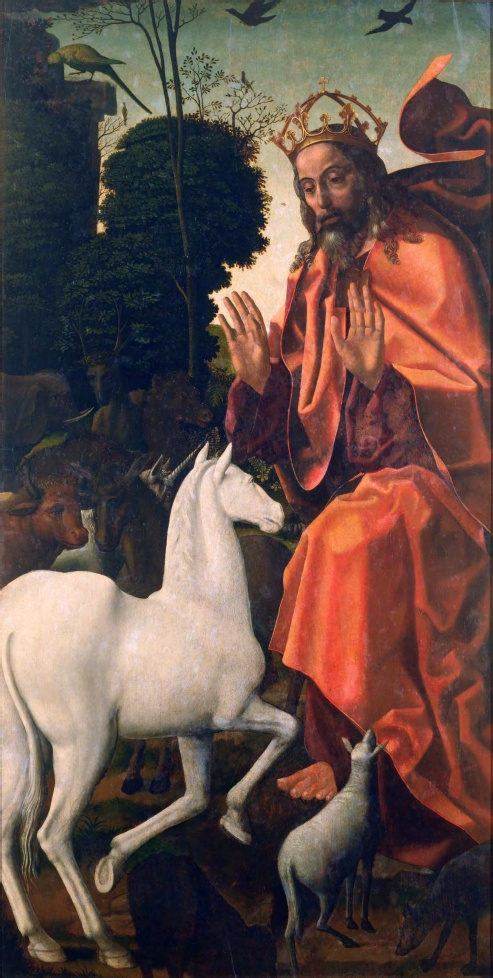
Many biblical translations of Genesis use polysyndetic syntax in describing the creation narrative.

Polysyndeton (from Ancient Greek πολύ poly 'many' and συνδετόν syndeton 'bound together with') is the insertion of repeated conjunctions into a sentence for deliberate effect, especially to slow the rhythm of the prose so as to produce an impressively solemn note.

In grammar, a polysyndetic coordination is a coordination in which all conjuncts are linked by coordinating conjunctions (usually and, but, or, nor in English).

== Rhetorical use ==
Polysyndeton and asyndeton, rhetorician Quintilian argues, are no more than the grouping of phrases or sentences with or without conjunction. Extensive use of conjunction in polysyndeton often has the effect of slowing the rhythm and solemnizing the tone. It may also give an incantatory rhythm aiding the flow of speech, as shown in the following excerpt from "After the Storm" by Ernest Hemingway:

I said, "Who killed him?" and he said, "I don't know who killed him but he's dead all right," and it was dark and there was water standing in the street and no lights and windows broke and boats all up in the town and trees blown down and everything all blown and I got a skiff and went out and found my boat where I had her inside Mango Key and she was all right only she was full of water.

Polysyndeton may also be used for emphasis; repeated conjunctions. When and is used frequently in a list, for example, it may have the effect of producing a catalog of individual, discrete items. However, the urgency from polysyndeton may be absent in cases where not only the last conjunction is needed; for example, the tenth commandment of Moses ("You shall not covet your neighbor’s wife, or his male or female servant, his ox or donkey, or anything that belongs to your neighbor" as written in Exodus 20:17) excessively uses "or," but, as it is for clarification, the effect is lost.

Polysyndeton may be used with any conjunction; while normally being used with coordinating conjunctions, subordinating conjunctions or conjunctive adverbs may be used. For example, in the following geometric theorem, the conjunctive adverb then is polysyndetically added: "If both of the lines A and C are parallel to the line B, then the lines A and C are parallel to one another."

== Examples ==
In ancient Greek literature, authors such as Homer used polysyndeton to add rhythm, build tension, or create meaning and complexity to their works. For example, conjunctions like “και” and “δε” repeat frequently.

A passage from the Book of Genesis (1:24–25) gives an instance of the stately effect of polysyndeton:

And God said, "Let the earth bring forth the living creature after his kind, cattle, and creeping thing, and beast of the earth after his kind." And it was so. And God made the beast of the earth after his kind and cattle after their kind, and everything that creeps upon the earth to its kind. And God saw that it was good.

The poet John Keats used conjunctions in a verse from "Endymion":

And soon it lightly dipped, and rose, and sank,

And dipped again...

=== In the King James Bible ===
Polysyndeton is used extensively in the King James Version of the Bible, where and is used as a literal translation of the Hebrew waw-consecutive and the Ancient Greek particle δέ. For example:

- "And every living substance was destroyed which was upon the face of the ground, both man, and cattle, and the creeping things, and the fowl of the heaven; and they were destroyed from the earth: and Noah only remained alive, and they that were with him in the ark." (Genesis 7:22–24)
- "Or if a soul touch any unclean thing, whether it be a carcass of an unclean beast, or a carcass of unclean cattle, or the carcass of unclean creeping things, and if it be hidden from him; he also shall be unclean, and guilty." (Leviticus 5:2)
- "And Joshua, and all of Israel with him, took Achan the son of Zerah, and the silver, and the garment, and the wedge of gold, and his sons, and his daughters, and his oxen, and his asses, and his sheep, and his tent, and all that he had." (Joshua 7.24)

=== In Shakespeare ===
Shakespeare used polysyndeton:

- "When thou dost ask me blessing I'll kneel down and ask of thee forgiveness. So we'll live and pray, and sing, and tell old tales, and laugh at gilded butterflies, and hear poor rogues talk of court news, and we'll talk with them too" (King Lear 5.3.11–5)
- "Why, this is not a boon! 'Tis as I should entreat you to wear your gloves, or feed on nourishing dishes, or keep you warm, or sue you to do a peculiar profit to your person" (Othello 3.3.85–9)
- "If there be cords, or knives, or poison, or fire, or suffocating streams, I'll not endure it" (Othello 3.3.443–5)
- "Though his face be better than any man's, yet his leg excels all men's, and for a hand and a foot and a body, though they be not to be talked on, yet they are past compare" (Romeo and Juliet 2.5.42–5)
- "Your love says, like an honest gentleman, and a courteous, and a kind, and a handsome, and, I warrant, a virtuous-where is your mother?" (Romeo and Juliet 2.5.59–61)

=== Contemporary usage ===
- "There were frowzy fields, and cow-houses, and dunghills, and dustheaps, and ditches, and gardens, and summer-houses, and carpet-beating grounds, at the very door of the Railway. Little tumuli of oyster shells in the oyster season, and of lobster shells in the lobster season, and of broken crockery and faded cabbage leaves in all seasons, encroached upon its high places." (Charles Dickens, Dombey and Son, 1848)
- "Papa O. never knocked. He kicked the door in happily and shouted cheerfully, 'What you say, all peoples? How's t'ings, ever-body?' Papa O. pulled people out of bed and rattled pans and laughed at nothing and argued with unseen bartenders until somebody gave him sausage and eggs and coffee and bread and hung the accordion safely away." (Nelson Algren, "How the Devil Came Down Division Street", 1944, in The Neon Wilderness, 1947)
- "Let the whitefolks have their money and power and segregation and sarcasm and big houses and schools and lawns like carpets, and books, and mostly—mostly—let them have their whiteness." (Maya Angelou, I Know Why the Caged Bird Sings, 1969)
- "Nor was it there because the person had been killed, or maimed or caught or burned or jailed or whipped or evicted or stomped or raped or cheated, since that could hardly qualify as news in a newspaper." (Toni Morrison, Beloved, 1987)
- "They crossed the river under a white quartermoon naked and pale and thin atop their horses. They'd stuffed their boots upside down into their jeans and stuffed their shirts and jackets after along with their warbags of shaving gear and ammunition and they belted the jeans shut at the waist and tied the legs loosely about their necks and dressed only in their hats they led the horses out onto the gravel spit and loosed the girthstraps and mounted and put the horses into the water with their naked heels." (Cormac McCarthy, All the Pretty Horses, 1992)
- "I'm angry and tired and restless and sad" (Jorge Rivera–Herrans, "Not Sorry for Loving You" from Epic: the Musical)

== See also ==
- Asyndeton – Literary scheme omitting conjunctions
- Syndeton – Grammatical construction

== General and cited sources ==
- Baldrick, Chris. 2008. Oxford Dictionary of Literary Terms. Oxford University Press. New York. ISBN 978-0-19-920827-2
- Corbett, Edward P. J. and Connors, Robert J. 1999. Style and Statement. Oxford University Press. New York, Oxford. ISBN 0-19-511543-0
- Forsyth, Mark. 2014. The Elements of Eloquence. Berkley Publishing Group/Penguin Publishing. New York. ISBN 978-0-425-27618-1
