= Syndeton =

Grammatical construction

Syndeton (from the Greek συνδετόν 'bound together with') or syndetic coordination in grammar is a form of syntactic coordination of the elements of a sentence (conjuncts) with the help of a coordinating conjunction. For instance, in a simple syndeton, two conjuncts are joined by a conjunction: "I will have eggs and ham".

In syndetic coordination with more than two conjuncts, the conjunction is placed between the two last conjuncts: "I will need bread, cheese and ham". The use of serial comma in front of the conjunction between the last two items ("I will need bread, cheese, and ham") depends on style guides and languages.

== See also ==
- Asyndeton – Literary scheme omitting conjunctions
- Polysyndeton – Use of repeated conjunctions for rhythmic effect
