= Veni, vidi, vici =

Latin phrase meaning "I came, I saw, I conquered" popularly attributed to Julius Caesar

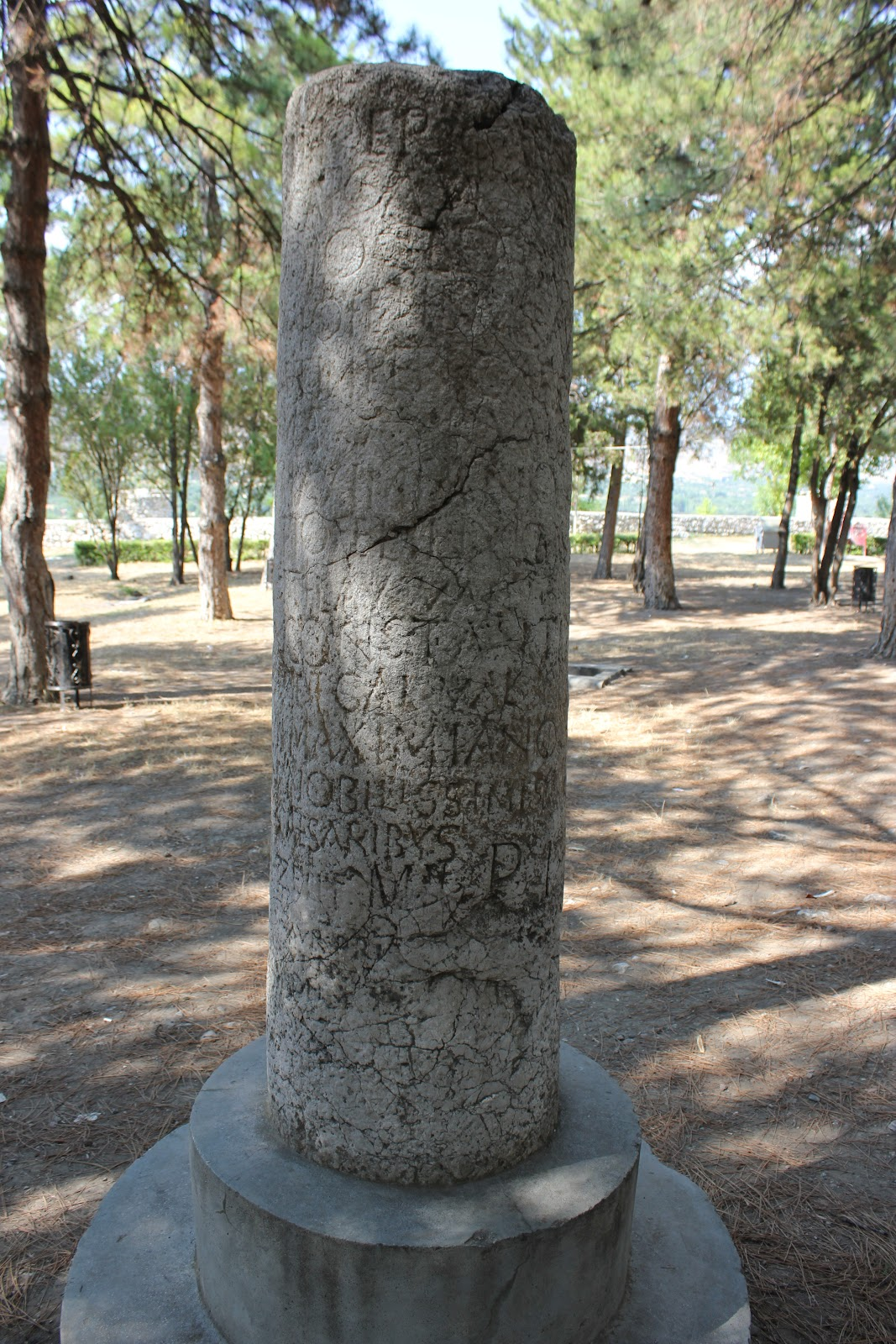
A view from the 2000-year-old historical castle column piece in Zile, Turkey where Julius Caesar said "Veni, vidi, vici".

Veni, vidi, vici (Classical Latin: [ˈweːniː ˈwiːdiː ˈwiːkiː], Ecclesiastical Latin: [ˈveːni ˈviːd̪i ˈviːt͡ʃi]; "I came; I saw; I conquered") is a Latin phrase used to refer to a swift, conclusive victory. The phrase is popularly attributed to Julius Caesar who, according to Appian, used the phrase in a letter to the Roman Senate around 47 BC after he had achieved a quick victory in his short war against Pharnaces II of Pontus at the Battle of Zela (modern-day Zile, Turkey).

The phrase is attributed in Plutarch's Life of Caesar and Suetonius's Lives of the Twelve Caesars: Julius. Plutarch writes that Caesar used it in a report to Amantius, a friend of his in Rome. Suetonius states that Caesar displayed the three words as an inscription during his Pontic triumph.

== Allusions and references ==
Veni, Vidi, Vici (1896)
Robert Browne Hall's 1896 march, Veni, Vidi, Vici, performed by the United States Air Force Band.

Variations of the sentence Veni, vidi, vici are often quoted, and also used in music, art, literature, and entertainment.

Since the time of Caesar, the phrase has been used in military contexts. King Jan III of Poland alluded to it after the 17th-century Battle of Vienna, saying Venimus, Vidimus, Deus vicit ("We came, we saw, God conquered"). In 2011, then US Secretary of State Hillary Clinton referred to the death of Muammar Gaddafi with a similar phrase, saying "We came, we saw, he died".

The sentence has also been used in music, including several well-known works over the years. The opening of Handel's 1724 opera Giulio Cesare contains the line: Curio, Cesare venne, e vide e vinse ("Curio, Caesar came, saw and conquered"). In popular music, it is expected that the audience will know the original quotation, so modified versions are frequently used. This can range from slight changes in perspective, as in the title song in the musical Mame (You came, you saw, you conquered) or the 1936 song These Foolish Things (Remind Me of You) (You came, you saw, you conquered me) to wordplay, such as in the album title Veni Vidi Vicious by Swedish band The Hives or Pitbull's song "Fireball" (I saw, I came, I conquered Or should I say, I saw I conquered, I came) or Ja Rule's debut album Venni Vetti Vecci. ASAP Rocky and Skepta use a variation in their song Praise the Lord (Da Shine) with "I came, I saw, I praise the Lord, then break the law".

The phrase appears in a variety of cultural contexts, such as this Philip Morris logo, from a pack of Marlboro cigarettes.

The phrase has also been heavily referenced in literature and film. The title of French poet Victor Hugo's Veni, vidi, vixi ("I came, I saw, I lived"), written after the death of his daughter Leopoldine at age 19 in 1843, uses the allusion with its first verse: J'ai bien assez vécu... ("I have lived quite long enough..."). Peter Venkman, one of the protagonists in the 1984 film Ghostbusters, delivers a humorous variation: "We came. We saw. We kicked its ass!" This line was among the 400 nominees for the AFI's 100 Years...100 Movie Quotes.

== Grammar ==
=== Latin ===
Veni, vidi, and vici are first person singular perfect indicative active forms of the Latin verbs veniō, vidēo, and vincō, which mean "I come", "I see", and "I conquer", respectively. The sentence's form is classed as a tricolon and a hendiatris.

=== English ===
The English phrase "I came, I saw, I conquered" employs what is known as a comma splice. Grammarians generally agree that using a comma to join two independent clauses should be done sparingly. Sometimes, the comma splice is avoided by using a semicolon instead: "I came; I saw; I conquered". Alternatively, "I came, I saw, I conquered" can be justified as an example of asyndeton, where the lack of the expected conjunction emphasizes the suddenness and swiftness of Caesar's victories. Similarly, this sentence also serves as a famous example of an alliteration due to the repeated use of its first consonant.

== See also ==
- Isocolon
- List of Latin phrases
- Ut est rerum omnium magister usus
