= Comma splice =

Use of a comma to join independent clauses

In written English usage, a comma splice or comma fault is the use of a comma to join two independent clauses. It is sometimes used in literary writing to convey a particular mood of informality. For example:

It is nearly half past five, we cannot reach town before dark. (Note: This example is adapted from the online, public-domain 1918 edition of The Elements of Style by William Strunk Jr.)

The comma splice is usually considered an error in English writing style, however some authorities on English usage consider comma splices appropriate in limited situations, such as informal writing or with short similar phrases.

== Description ==
Comma splices are rare in most published writing, (Note: By "published writing", this article is referring to professionally published writing, such as commercially published works, where someone other than the author has proofread the work before it is published. Self-published works, if carefully examined and corrected by someone with language skills, can qualify as professionally done.) but are common among inexperienced writers of English.

The Elements of Style by William Strunk Jr. and E. B. White advises using a semicolon, not a comma, to join two grammatically complete clauses, or writing the clauses as separate sentences.

Comma splices are similar to run-on sentences, which join two independent clauses without any punctuation or a coordinating conjunction such as and, but, for, etc. Sometimes the two types of sentences are treated differently based on the presence or absence of a comma, but most writers consider the comma splice a special type of run-on sentence. According to Garner's Modern English Usage:

[M]ost usage authorities accept comma splices when (1) the clauses are short and closely related, (2) there is no danger of a miscue, and (3) the context is informal ... But even when all three criteria are met, some readers are likely to object.

Comma splices often arise when writers use conjunctive adverbs (such as furthermore, however, or moreover) to separate two independent clauses instead of using a coordinating conjunction.

== Criticism ==
=== Objection to term ===
The comprehensive descriptive grammar The Cambridge Grammar of the English Language published by Cambridge University Press in 2002 rejects the term, finding it to be used chiefly by "prescriptivists" and to imply a preference for sentences to be split into two, reserving special objection to this occurring in cases "where the second clause begins with a connective adjunct such as however, nevertheless, thus, and the like". (Note: "Example [i] illustrates what prescriptivists call a ‘spliced’ or ‘run-on’ comma, with the implication that the sentence should be split into two. A special case of this is where the second clause begins with a connective adjunct such as however, nevertheless, thus, and the like; while [ii] is an attested example, it would generally be regarded as unacceptable.")

=== Objection to error status ===
The Elements of Style notes an exception to the earlier-mentioned semicolon rule, preferring a comma when the clauses are "very short and alike in form", or when the sentence's tone is "easy and conversational". For example:

The gate swung apart, the bridge fell, the portcullis was drawn up.

==== In literature ====
Comma splices are occasionally used in fiction, poetry, and other forms of literature to convey a particular mood or informal style. Some authors use commas to separate short clauses only. The comma splice is more commonly found in works from the 18th and 19th century, when written prose mimicked speech more closely.

The New Fowler's Modern English Usage describes the use of the comma splice by the authors Elizabeth Jolley and Iris Murdoch:

We are all accustomed to the ... conjoined sentences that turn up from children or from our less literate friends... Curiously, this habit of writing comma-joined sentences is not uncommon in both older and present-day fiction. Modern examples: I have the bed still, it is in every way suitable for the old house where I live now (E. Jolley); Marcus ... was of course already quite a famous man, Ludens had even heard of him from friends at Cambridge (I. Murdoch).

Journalist Oliver Kamm wrote in 2016 of novelist Jane Austen's use of the comma splice, "Tastes in punctuation are not constant. It makes no sense to accuse Jane Austen of incorrect use of the comma, as no one would have levelled this charge against her at the time. Her conventions of usage were not ours."

The author and journalist Lynne Truss writes in Eats, Shoots & Leaves that "so many highly respected writers observe the splice comma that a rather unfair rule emerges on this one: only do it if you're famous." Citing Samuel Beckett, E. M. Forster, and Somerset Maugham, she says: "Done knowingly by an established writer, the comma splice is effective, poetic, dashing. Done equally knowingly by people who are not published writers, it can look weak or presumptuous. Done ignorantly by ignorant people, it is awful."
