= Sentence function =

Intended purpose of spoken speech

In linguistics, a sentence function refers to a speaker's purpose in uttering a specific sentence, clause, or phrase. Whether a listener is present or not is sometimes irrelevant. It answers the question: "Why has this been said?" The five basic sentence forms (or "structures") in English are the declarative, interrogative, exclamative, imperative and the optative. These correspond to the discourse functions statement, question, exclamation, and command respectively. The different forms involve different combinations in word order, the addition of certain auxiliaries or particles, or other times by providing a special form. There is no clear one-to-one correspondence between the forms/structures and their discourse functions. For example, a declarative form can be used to ask a question, and interrogative form can be used to make a statement.

For instance, the following sentence has declarative form:

You need some help

But when this is spoken with a rising intonation, it becomes a question:

You need some help?

Conversely, rhetorical questions have the form of an interrogative, but they are really statements:

Who cares? ( = I don't care)

The four main categories can be further specified as being either communicative or informative, although this is somewhat simplistic.

== Communicative vs. informative ==
While communication is traditionally defined as the transfer of information, the two terms, under present context, are differentiated as follows below:

=== Communicative sentences ===
These types of sentences are more intended for the speaker's sake than for any potential listener. They are meant more for the speaker's immediate wants and needs. These sentences tend to be less intentional (out of frustration for example), in general more literal, more primitive, and are usually about the here and now. Because of these features, it is generally speculated that this is pretty much the basis or limitation of any form of animal communication. (Speculated because scientists will never truly be able to understand non-human forms of communication like we do our own; although studies with "talking" primates have clued us in to a certain degree.)

==== Exclamative ====
An exclamative is a sentence type in English that typically spontaneously expresses a feeling or emotion, but does not use one of the other structures. It often has the form as in the examples below of [WH + Complement + Subject + Verb], but can be minor sentences (i.e. without a verb) such as [WH + Complement] How wonderful!. In other words, exclamative sentences are used to make exclamations:

What a stupid man he is!

How wonderful you look!

==== Imperative ====
An imperative sentence gives anything from a command or order, to a request, direction, instruction, suggestion, or implication. Imperative sentences are more intentional than exclamatory sentences and do require an audience, (Note: Although the audience could be the speaker (someone talking to themself), e.g., “Let me see, where did I put my glasses/keys/face mask?”) as their aim is to get the person(s) being addressed either to do or to not do something. And although this function usually deals with the immediate temporal vicinity, its scope can be extended, i.e. you can order somebody to move out as soon as you find yourself a job. The negative imperative can also be called the prohibitive and the inclusive plural imperative, the cohortative. It is debatable whether the imperative is only truly possible in the second person. The vocative case of nouns can be said to indicate the imperative as well since it does not seek information, but rather a reaction from the one being addressed. An imperative can end in either a period or an exclamation point depending on delivery.

- Look at me.
- After separating them from the yolks, beat the whites until they are light and fluffy.

==== Optative ====
An optative sentence describes wishes, desires, blessings, curses, prayers or hope regarding a given action. It is related to the subjunctive mood, a grammatical feature that indicates the speaker's attitude toward something, such as a wish, emotions, judgment, possibility, opinion, obligation, or action that has yet to occur. Optative sentences may end with an exclamation mark or a full stop.

Long live the king!

God bless you.

=== Informative sentences ===
Informative sentences are more for the mutual benefit of both the listener and the speaker, and, in fact, require more of an interaction between both parties involved. They are more intentional or premeditated, less essential, more cooperative, and they aim to either provide or retrieve information, making them quintessential abstractions. But perhaps the most differentiating quality that distinguishes informative sentences from communicative ones is that the former more naturally and freely make use of displacement. Displacement refers to information lost in time and space which allows us to communicate ideas relating to the past or future (not just the now), and that have taken or can take place at a separate location (from here). This is one of the biggest differences between human communication and that of other animals.

==== Declarative ====
The declarative sentence is the most common kind of sentence, and can be considered the default form: when a language forms a question or a command, it will be a modification of the declarative. A declarative states an idea (either objectively or subjectively on the part of the speaker; and may be either true or false) for the purpose of transferring information. In writing, a statement will end with a period.

- The internet connection is working again.
- She must be out of her mind.

==== Interrogative ====
An interrogative sentence asks a question and hence ends with a question mark. In speech, it almost universally ends in a rising inflection. Its effort is to try to gather information that is presently unknown to the interrogator, or to seek validation for a preconceived notion held. Beyond seeking confirmation or contradiction, sometimes it is approval or permission that is sought as well, among other reasons one could have for posing a question. The one exception in which it isn't information that is needed, is when the question happens to be rhetorical (see allofunctional implicature section below). While an imperative is a call for action, an interrogative is a call for information.

- What do you want?
- Are you feeling well?

== Declarative vs. affirmative vs. positive ==
A declarative statement is not synonymous with an affirmative one, nor need it be true. Declaratives may be phrased positively or negatively (assert or negate), agree with or contradict a polar question (affirm or refute), be honest or deceive (speak frankly or lie), and be true or false (inform accurately or misinform). All qualify as declarative sentences. Declarative refers to a sentence's structure, while positive, affirmative, and true deal with a sentence's grammatical degree of comparison, polarity, and veridicality, which is why the different terms can overlap simultaneously.

Though not as erroneous as the above misnomer, there is a clouding that can occur between the slight distinction of the affirmative, and the positive. Although it semantically speaking comes natural that positive is the opposite of negative, and therefore should be completely synonymous with affirmative, grammatically speaking, once again they tend to be separate entities; depending on specificity. Positive in linguistic terms refers to the primary, noncomparative sense of an adjective or adverb, while affirmative refers to the perceived validity of the entire sentence.

Thus, all three terms being separate entities, an adjective or adverb can be in the positive degree but expressed in the negative, so that the sentence, This hummer does not seem to be eco-friendly, has all negative, positive, and declarative properties.

In fact, an exclamatory, imperative, as well as a question can be in the negative form: I can't do this!, Don't touch me, Don't you want to?

== See also ==
- Grammatical polarity
- Implicature
- Logic
- Rhetorical question
- Sentence (linguistics)

== Sources ==
- Laurie E. Rozakis, The Complete Idiot's Guide to Grammar and Style. 2003. ISBN 978-1-59257-115-4
- George Yule, The Study of Language. 2005. ISBN 978-0-521-54320-0
- Steven Pinker, The Language Instinct. 1994 ISBN 0-06-095833-2
- https://www.ucl.ac.uk/internet-grammar/clauses/discours.htm
