= Dependent clause =

Grammatical clause adding information to a primary clause

A dependent clause, also known as a subordinate clause, subclause or embedded clause, is a certain type of clause that juxtaposes an independent clause within a complex sentence. For instance, in the sentence "I know Bette is a dolphin", the clause "Bette is a dolphin" occurs as the complement of the verb "know" rather than as a freestanding sentence. Subtypes of dependent clauses include content clauses, relative clauses, adverbial clauses, and clauses that complement an independent clause in the subjunctive mood.

== Types ==
=== Content clause ===
A content clause, also known as a "noun clause", provides content implied or commented upon by its main clause. It can be a subject, predicate nominative, direct object, appositive, indirect object, or object of the preposition. Some of the English words that introduce content clauses are that, who (and formal whom), whoever (and formal whomever), whether, why, what, how, when, and where. Notice that some of these words also introduce relative and adverbial clauses. A clause is a content clause if a pronoun (he, she, it, or they) could be substituted for it.

Examples:

- I know who said that. (I know them. The dependent clause serves as the object of the main-clause verb "know".)
- Whoever made that assertion is wrong. (They are wrong. The dependent clause serves as the subject of the main clause.)

In English, in some instances the subordinator that can be omitted.

Example 1:

- I know that he is here.
- I know he is here.

Example 2:

- I think that it is pretty. (less common)
- I think it is pretty. (more common)

=== Relative (adjectival) clause ===
In Indo-European languages, a relative clause, also called an adjectival clause or an adjective clause, meets three requirements:

1. Like all dependent clauses, it contains a verb (and also a subject unless it is a non-finite dependent clause). However, in a pro-drop language the subject may be a zero pronoun: the pronoun may not be explicitly included because its identity is conveyed by a verbal inflection.
2. It begins with a relative adverb [when, where, how, or why in English] or a relative pronoun [who, whom, whose, that, what or which in English]. However, the English relative pronoun (other than what) may be omitted and only implied if it plays the role of the object of the verb or object of a preposition in a restrictive clause; for example, He is the boy I saw is equivalent to He is the boy whom I saw, and I saw the boy you are talking about is equivalent to the more formal I saw the boy about whom you are talking.
3. The relative clause functions as an adjective, answering questions such as "what kind?", "how many?" or "which one?"

The adjective clause in English will follow one of these patterns:

- Relative Pronoun [Functioning as Object of Verb] + Subject + Verb

This is the ball that I was bouncing.

- Relative Pronoun [Functioning as Object of Verb] (Omitted but Implied) + Subject + Verb

This is the ball I was bouncing.

- Relative Adverb + Subject + Verb (possibly + Object of Verb)

That is the house where I grew up.
That is the house where I met her.

- Relative Pronoun [Functioning as Subject] + Verb (possibly + Object of Verb)

That is the person who hiccuped.
That is the person who saw me.

- Relative Pronoun [Functioning as Object of Preposition] + Subject + Verb (possibly + Object of Verb) + Preposition

That is the person who(m) I was talking about.
That is the person who(m) I was telling you about.

- Preposition + Relative Pronoun [Functioning as Object of Preposition] + Subject + Verb (possibly + Object of Verb)

That is the person about whom I was talking.
That is the person about whom I was telling you.

- Possessive Relative Pronoun + Noun [Functioning as Subject] + Verb (possibly + Object of Verb)

That is the dog whose big brown eyes pleaded for another cookie.
That is the dog whose big brown eyes begged me for another cookie.

- Possessive Relative Pronoun + Noun [Functioning as Object of Verb] + Subject + Verb

That is the person whose car I saw.

For a discussion of adjective clauses in languages other than English, see Relative clause#Examples.

==== Punctuation ====
===== English punctuation =====
The punctuation of an adjective clause depends on whether it is essential (restrictive) or nonessential (nonrestrictive) and uses commas accordingly. Essential clauses are not set off with commas; nonessential clauses are. An adjective clause is essential if the information it contains is necessary to the meaning of the sentence:

- The vegetables that people often leave uneaten are usually the most nutritious.

The word "vegetables" is non-specific. Accordingly, for the reader to know which are being mentioned, one must have the information provided in the adjective clause (in italics). Because it restricts the meaning of "vegetable", the adjective clause is called a restrictive clause. It is essential to the meaning of the main clause and uses no commas (and so does not experience a pause when spoken).

However, if the additional information does not help to identify more narrowly the identity of the noun antecedent but rather simply provides further information about it, the adjective clause is nonrestrictive and so requires commas (or a spoken pause) to separate it from the rest of the sentence:

- Broccoli, which people often leave uneaten, is very nutritious.

Depending on context, a particular noun could be modified by either a restrictive or nonrestrictive adjective clause. For example, while "broccoli" is modified nonrestrictively in the preceding sentence, it is modified restrictively in the following.

- The broccoli which (or that) people leave uneaten is often nutritious.

=== Adverbial clause ===
"He saw Mary when he was in New York" and "They studied hard because they had a test" both contain adverbial clauses (in italics). Adverbial clauses express when, why, where, opposition, and conditions, and, as with all dependent clauses, they cannot stand alone. For example, When he was in New York is not a complete sentence; it needs to be completed by an independent clause, as in:

- He went to the Guggenheim Museum when he was in New York.

or equivalently

- When he was in New York, he went to the Guggenheim Museum.

=== Non-finite dependent clauses ===
Dependent clauses may be headed by an infinitive, gerund, or other non-finite verb form, which in linguistics is called deranked. For instance:

- Sit up straight while singing.

In these cases, the subject of the dependent clause may take a non-nominative form. An example is:

- I want him to vanish.

== Sentence structure ==
A complex sentence contains an independent clause and at least one dependent clause. A sentence with two or more independent clauses plus (one or more) dependent clauses is referred to as a compound-complex sentence. (Every clause contains a subject and predicate.) Here are some English examples:

My sister cried because she scraped her knee. (complex sentence)

- Subjects: My sister, she
- Predicates: cried, scraped her knee
- Subordinating conjunction: because

When they told me (that) I won the contest, I cried, but I didn't faint. (compound-complex sentence)

- Subjects: they, I, I, I
- Predicates: told me, won the contest, cried, didn't faint
- Subordinating conjunctions: when, that (implied or understood)
- Coordinating conjunction: but

This sentence contains two dependent clauses: "When they told me", and "(that) I won the contest", the latter which serves as the object of the verb "told". The connecting word "that", if not explicitly included, is understood to implicitly precede "I won" and in either case functions as a subordinating conjunction. This sentence also includes two independent clauses, "I cried" and "I didn't faint", connected by the coordinating conjunction "but". The first dependent clause, together with its object (the second dependent clause), adverbially modifies the verbs of both main clauses.

== See also ==
- Dependent statement
- Responsive predicate
- Relative pronoun
- Grammatical conjunction
- Sentence
  - Compound sentence
  - Simple sentence
- Subjunctive mood
- Temporal clause (Latin)
