= Ut est rerum omnium magister usus =

Latin phrase praising experience as the best teacher

Ut est rerum omnium magister usus (roughly "experience is the teacher of all things" or more generally "experience is the best teacher") is a quote attributed to Julius Caesar in De Bello Civili, the war commentaries of the Civil War. Since then the phrase has become a common saying regarding learning and leadership.

== Commentary ==
John C. Maxwell stated that the only way of learning from personal experiences is to reflect on them, something he feels Caesar had done a lot of, which was the only way he was able to become successful and write down his thoughts.

== See also ==
- Alea iacta est
- Veni, vidi, vici
- List of Latin phrases
