= Asyndeton =

Literary scheme omitting conjunctions

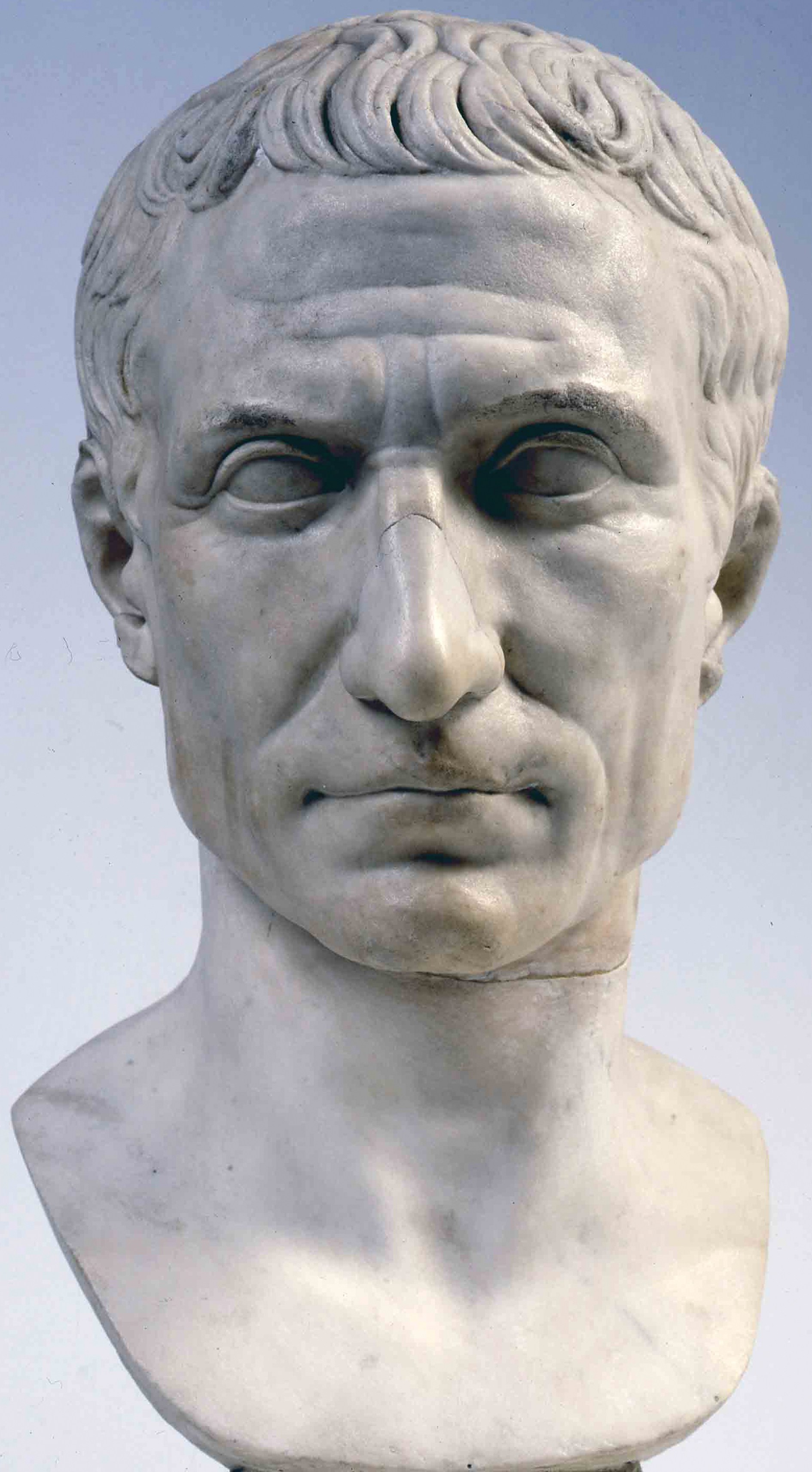
Julius Caesar (above) who is quoted as saying the famous asyndeton "veni, vidi, vici" ("I came, I saw, I conquered").

Asyndeton (UK: /æˈsɪndɪtən, ə-/, US: /əˈsɪndətɒn, ˌeɪ-/; from the Greek: ἀσύνδετον 'unconnected', sometimes called asyndetism) is a literary scheme in which one or several conjunctions are deliberately omitted from a series of related clauses. Asyndeton is often used for the purpose of hastening rhythm.

Asyndeton may be contrasted with syndeton (syndetic coordination) and polysyndeton, which describe the use of one or multiple coordinating conjunctions, respectively. More generally, in grammar, an asyndetic coordination is a type of coordination in which no coordinating conjunction is present between the conjuncts.

== Rhetorical use ==
According to Quintilian, both asyndeton and polysyndeton are merely the congeries of words, phrases, or sentences with or without conjunction. Asyndeton principally involves the omission of conjunctions; some definitions occasionally may include the ellipses of articles or pronouns. Asyndeton is principally used to create a hurried rhythm and efficiency of language. Asyndeton is suited well for statements of great force and concision.

The device may be used to express disorder or incompleteness. For example, the sentence "John studies geometry, philosophy, rhetoric, science" implies not just that those are his academic studies, but that John is a polymath who may study other subjects. Furthermore, the lack of a conjunction makes the items hierarchically equal. Additionally, the omission of conjunctions may lead to ambivalence; it may, for example, be mistaken for ambivalence in a phrase like "they stared at the children, the babies:" it is unclear whether they look at the children who are babies or the children and the babies.

Aristotle recommends the use of asyndeton within spoken (not written) speeches— ensuring to vary one's tone— for their dramatic effect. Furthermore, he suggests that one uses an asyndetic or "disconnected style" in one's closing arguments to distinguish the peroration with the rest of the speech. The final words of his Rhetoric echo this technique:

I have done. You have heard me. The facts are before you. I ask for your judgement.

Asyndeton was favored by the Latin poets, including Horace and Statius, as well as medieval Latin poets; medieval German poets, like Walther von der Vogelweide and Wolfram von Eschenbach; and German baroque poets, including Andreas Gryphius for their language's felicity in asyndeton due to their inflectiveness. Others that favored asyndeton were Spanish and French baroque poets; imagists, who favored its brevity; and W. H. Auden, due to his preference of loaded, pithy speech.

== Examples ==
=== Omission of conjunction "and" ===
- "Indulge your father, obey your relatives, gratify your friends, submit to the laws" — Rhetorica ad Herrenium
- "Enter into a complete defence, make no objection, give your slaves to be examined, be eager to find the truth" — ibid.
- "Rain, wind, clover, leaves became parts of my life. Real parts of my body" — Anne Hébert, Le Torrent
- "Consciousness of place came ebbing back to him slowly over a vast tract of time unlit, unfelt, unlived" — James Joyce, Portrait of the Artist as a Young Man
- "We use words like honor, code, loyalty. We use these words as the backbone of a life spent defending something. You use them as a punch line" — Jack Nicholson, A Few Good Men
- "Let’s take a look at the side. It’s really thin. It’s thinner than any smart phone out there, at 11.6 millimeters. Thinner than the Q, thinner than the BlackJack, thinner than all of them. It’s really nice" — Steve Jobs, 2007

Several notable examples can be found in political speeches:

- "We shall go on to the end, we shall fight in France, we shall fight on the seas and oceans, we shall fight with growing confidence and growing strength in the air, we shall defend our Island, whatever the cost may be, we shall fight on the beaches, we shall fight on the landing grounds, we shall fight in the fields and in the streets, we shall fight in the hills; we shall never surrender. . ." — Winston Churchill, "We shall fight on the beaches"
- "...that we shall pay any price, bear any burden, meet any hardship, support any friend, oppose any foe to assure the survival and the success of liberty" — John F. Kennedy, Inaugural Address, 1961.
- “Duty, Honor, Country. Those three hallowed words reverently dictate what you ought to be, what you can be, what you will be. They are your rallying points: to build courage when courage seems to fail; to regain faith when there seems to be little cause for faith; to create hope when hope becomes forlorn.” — Douglas MacArthur, 1962

=== Omission of other conjunctions ===
- "They may have it in well-doing, they may have it in learning, they may have it even in criticizing" — Matthew Arnold, The Function of Criticism at the Present Time (or is omitted)
- "A person or what looked like one was laboring over the crest of the hill and coming toward them with one hand raised in blessing, greeting, fending flies. He was dressed in a dusty frockcoat and carried a walking stick and he wore a pair of octagonal glasses on the one pane of which the late sun shone while a watery eye peered from the naked wire aperture of the other." — Cormac McCarthy, Outer Dark (or is omitted)
- "Should I bring him down, should I scream and shout, should I speak of love, let my feelings out? — "I Don't Know How to Love Him," Jesus Christ Superstar (likely, or is omitted)
- "He is not convinced you’re hurting, You’re not bleeding, He forgets you bleed monthly when not hurting, He doesn’t understand your soul speaks the moon’s language," — Vuyokazi Ngemntu, "Said one mistress to another" (because is omitted)

== Brachylogia ==
Brachylogia— a word coined by Tudor rhetoricians— is a type of asyndeton involving the omission of conjunction between single words or phrases gives the effect of a quick, broken speech. In the following example in Abraham Lincoln's Gettysburg Address, he states:

"...and that government of the people, by the people, for the people shall not perish from the earth."

Notices how between 'by the people' and 'for the people,' there should be a conjunction, yet it is omitted.

== See also ==
- Apo koinou construction
- Parallelism
- Parataxis
- Reduced relative clause, a relative clause not marked by an overt complementizer
- Zeugma
- Polysyndeton – Use of repeated conjunctions for rhythmic effect
- Syndeton – Grammatical construction

== Sources ==
- Baldrick, Chris. 2008. Oxford Dictionary of Literary Terms. Oxford University Press. New York. ISBN 978-0-19-920827-2
- Corbett, Edward P. J. and Connors, Robert J. 1999. Style and Statement. Oxford University Press. New York, Oxford. ISBN 0-19-511543-0
- Forsyth, Mark. 2014. The Elements of Eloquence. Berkley Publishing Group/Penguin Publishing. New York. ISBN 978-0-425-27618-1
