= Genitive connector =

Part of speech

A genitive connector is a part of speech used in formation of compound terms through conjunctions. It is used especially in the Bantu languages to denote special word categories. Nouns can be modified by other nouns or other categories. There is prototypically a head word that comes before the connector and another one following. Long terms can therefore be achieved through the use of these genitive connectors. Commonly used connectors in Swahili take the form -a. Examples from selected bantu languages include.

== Examples ==
- Example in Swahili wa > Mkojo wa mtoto; ya > nywele ya mama; cha> kidole cha gumba, la> Titi la mama etc.
- Example in Gikuyu: wa> Muti wa baba; ya>miti ya haaro; ga> gakunia gakwa etc.
- Example of a chain formed through compounding by conjunction by use of genitive connector: Mayai ya kuku wa kienyeji.
