= T-unit =

Term in linguistics

In linguistics, a T-unit (or minimally terminable unit) consists of the shortest grammatically allowable sentences into which writing can be split.

The term T-unit was coined by Kellogg Hunt in 1965. Often, but not always, a T-unit is a sentence.

More technically, a T-unit is a dominant clause and its dependent clauses: as Hunt said: it is "one main clause with all subordinate clauses attached to it" (Hunt 1965:20). T-units are often used in the analysis of written and spoken discourse, such as in studies on errors in second language writing. The number of error-free T-units may be counted, as in Robb et al. (1986), or changes in accuracy per T-unit overdrafts of compositions may be measured (Sachs and Polio, 2007).

Young (1995) gives some examples of what a T-unit is and is not:

"The following elements were counted as one T-unit: a single clause, a matrix plus subordinate clause, two or more phrases in apposition, and fragments of clauses produced by ellipsis. Co-ordinate clauses were counted as two t-units. Elements not counted as t-units include backchannel cues such as mhm and yeah, and discourse boundary markers such as okay, thanks or good. False starts were integrated into the following t-unit." (Young 1995:38)

== See also ==
- Clause
- Sentence (linguistics)
