= Conjunctive adverb =

Adverb connecting two independent clauses

A conjunctive adverb, adverbial conjunction, or subordinating adverb is an adverb that connects two clauses by converting the clause it introduces into an adverbial modifier of the verb in the main clause. For example, in "I told him; thus, he knows" and "I told him. Thus, he knows", thus is a conjunctive adverb.

== Examples ==
Some examples containing conjunctive adverbs are:

Bob loved Mary with all his heart; however, he knew he could not be with her.

I cleaned my room; then, I went to the store.

I cleaned my room, and then I went to the store.

== Logic ==
The clause that a conjunctive adverb introduces invariably modifies a (usually previously expressed) logical predication. Specific conjunctive adverbs are used to signal and signify purpose or reason (so that), sequence (then, since), exception (though), and comparison (whereas).

== Common English conjunctive adverbs ==
Some common English conjunctive adverbs are:

- accordingly
- also
- anyway
- besides
- certainly
- consequently
- finally
- furthermore
- hence
- however
- in addition
- in fact
- incidentally
- indeed
- instead
- lately
- likewise
- meanwhile
- moreover
- nevertheless
- next
- nonetheless
- now
- otherwise
- rather
- similarly
- since
- still
- subsequently
- then
- thereby
- therefore
- thus

== English punctuation ==
Conjunctive adverbs are frequently preceded by a semicolon or a period (full stop). They are usually followed by a comma. For example, "I told him; however, he did not remember" and "I told him. However, he did not remember" are both valid.

== See also ==
- Conjunction (grammar)
- Transition words
