= Sentence clause structure =

How clauses compose sentences in grammar and syntax

In grammar, sentence and clause structure, commonly known as sentence composition, is the classification of sentences based on the number and kind of clauses in their syntactic structure. Such division is an element of traditional grammar.

== Typology of clauses ==
In English, sentences are composed of five clause patterns:

1. Subject + Verb (intransitive)
  Example: She runs.
2. Subject + Verb (transitive) + Object
  Example: She runs the meeting.
3. Subject + Verb (linking) + Subject Complement (adjective, noun, pronoun)
  Example: Abdul is happy. Jeanne is a person. I am she.
4. Subject + Verb (transitive) + Indirect Object + Direct Object
  Example: She made me a pie.
  This clause pattern is a derivative of S+V+O, transforming the object of a preposition into an indirect object of the verb, as the example sentence in transformational grammar is actually "She made a pie for me".
5. Subject + Verb (transitive) + Object + Object Complement
  Example: They made him happy.
  They did not make "him", and they did not make "happy"; they made "him happy"—the object and its complement form a syntactical unit.

Sentences – which are composed of these clauses, in either "dependent" or "independent" form – also have patterns, as explained below.

== Typology of sentences ==
A simple sentence consists of only one clause. A compound sentence consists of two or more independent clauses. A complex sentence has at least one independent clause plus at least one dependent clause. A set of words with no independent clause may be an incomplete sentence, also called a sentence fragment.

A sentence consisting of at least one dependent clause and at least two independent clauses may be called a complex-compound sentence or compound-complex sentence.

Sentence 1 is an example of a simple sentence. Sentence 2 is compound because "so" is considered a coordinating conjunction in English, and sentence 3 is complex. Sentence 4 is compound-complex (also known as complex-compound). Example 5 is a sentence fragment.

1. I like trains.
2. I don't know how to bake, so I buy my bread already made.
3. I enjoyed the apple pie that you bought for me.
4. The dog lived in the garden, but the cat, who was smarter, lived inside the house.
5. What an idiot!

The simple sentence in example 1 contains one clause. Example 2 has two clauses (I don't know how to bake and I buy my bread already made), combined into a single sentence with the coordinating conjunction so. In example 3, I enjoyed the apple pie is an independent clause, and that you bought for me is a dependent clause; the sentence is thus complex. In sentence 4, The dog lived in the garden and the cat lived inside the house are both independent clauses; who was smarter is a dependent clause. Example 5 is an exclamatory sentence of an exclamative and a noun phrase but no verb. It is not a grammatically-complete clause.

== Simple sentences ==
A simple sentence structure contains one independent clause and no dependent clause.

- I run.

This simple sentence has one independent clause which contains one subject, I, and one verb, run.

- The girl ran into her bedroom.

This simple sentence has one independent clause which contains one subject, girl, and one predicate, ran into her bedroom. The predicate is a verb phrase that consists of more than one word.

- In the backyard, the dog barked and howled at the cat.

This simple sentence has one independent clause which contains one subject, dog, and one predicate, barked and howled at the cat. This predicate has two verbs, known as a compound predicate: barked and howled. (This should not be confused with a compound sentence.) In the backyard and at the cat are prepositional phrases.

== Compound sentences ==
In English, a compound sentence is composed of at least two independent clauses. It does not require a dependent clause. The clauses are joined by a coordinating conjunction, a semicolon that functions as a conjunction, a colon instead of a semicolon between two sentences when the second sentence explains or illustrates the first sentence and no coordinating conjunction is being used to connect the sentences, or a conjunctive adverb preceded by a semicolon. A conjunction can be used to make a compound sentence. Conjunctions are words such as for, and, nor, but, or, yet, and so. Examples:

- I started on time, but I arrived late.
- I will accept your offer or decline it; these are the two options.
- The law was passed: from April 1, all cars would have to be tested.
- The war was lost; consequently, the whole country was occupied.

The use of a comma to separate two independent clauses without the addition of an appropriate conjunction is called a comma splice and is generally considered an error (when used in English). Example:

- The sun was shining, everyone appeared happy.

If a sentence contains homogenous members referring to another common member of the sentence, the sentence may be considered either simple or compound. If the homogenous members are removed, then the sentence is called contracted. In some languages, like Russian, a comma is not always required in a sentence with homogenous members.

- Alex likes to fish, and he is going fishing on Friday – Alex likes to fish, and is going fishing on Friday.

== Complex and compound-complex sentences ==
A complex sentence has one or more dependent clauses (also called subordinate clauses). Since a dependent clause cannot stand on its own as a sentence, complex sentences must also have at least one independent clause. In short, a sentence with one or more dependent clauses and at least one independent clause is a complex sentence. A sentence with two or more independent clauses and one or more dependent clauses is called compound-complex or complex-compound.

In addition to a subject and a verb, dependent clauses contain a subordinating conjunction or similar word. There are a large number of subordinating conjunctions in English. Some of them give the clause an adverbial function, specifying time, place, or manner. Such clauses are called adverbial clauses.

- When I stepped out into the bright sunlight, from the darkness of the movie house, I had only two things in my mind. (S. E. Hinton, The Outsiders)

This complex sentence contains an adverbial clause, When I stepped out into the bright sunlight from the darkness of the movie house. The adverbial clause describes when and where the action of the main clause, I had only two things on my mind, took place.

A relative clause is a dependent clause that modifies a noun or noun phrase in the independent clause. In other words, the relative clause functions similar to an adjective.

- Let him who has been deceived complain. (Miguel de Cervantes, Don Quixote)
- You, who have never known your family, see them standing around you. (J.K. Rowling, Harry Potter and the Sorcerer's Stone)

In the first example, the restrictive relative clause who has been deceived specifies or defines the meaning of him in the independent clause, Let him complain. In the second example, the non-restrictive relative clause who have never known your family describes you in the independent clause, You see them standing around you.

A noun clause is a dependent clause that functions like a noun. A noun clause may function as the subject of a clause, a predicate nominative, an object or an appositive.

- What she had realized was that love was that moment when your heart was about to burst. (Stieg Larsson, The Girl with the Dragon Tattoo)

In this sentence the independent clause contains two noun clauses. The noun clause What she had realized serves as the subject of the verb was, and that love was that moment serves as complement. The sentence also contains a relative clause, when your heart was about to burst.

== Incomplete sentences ==
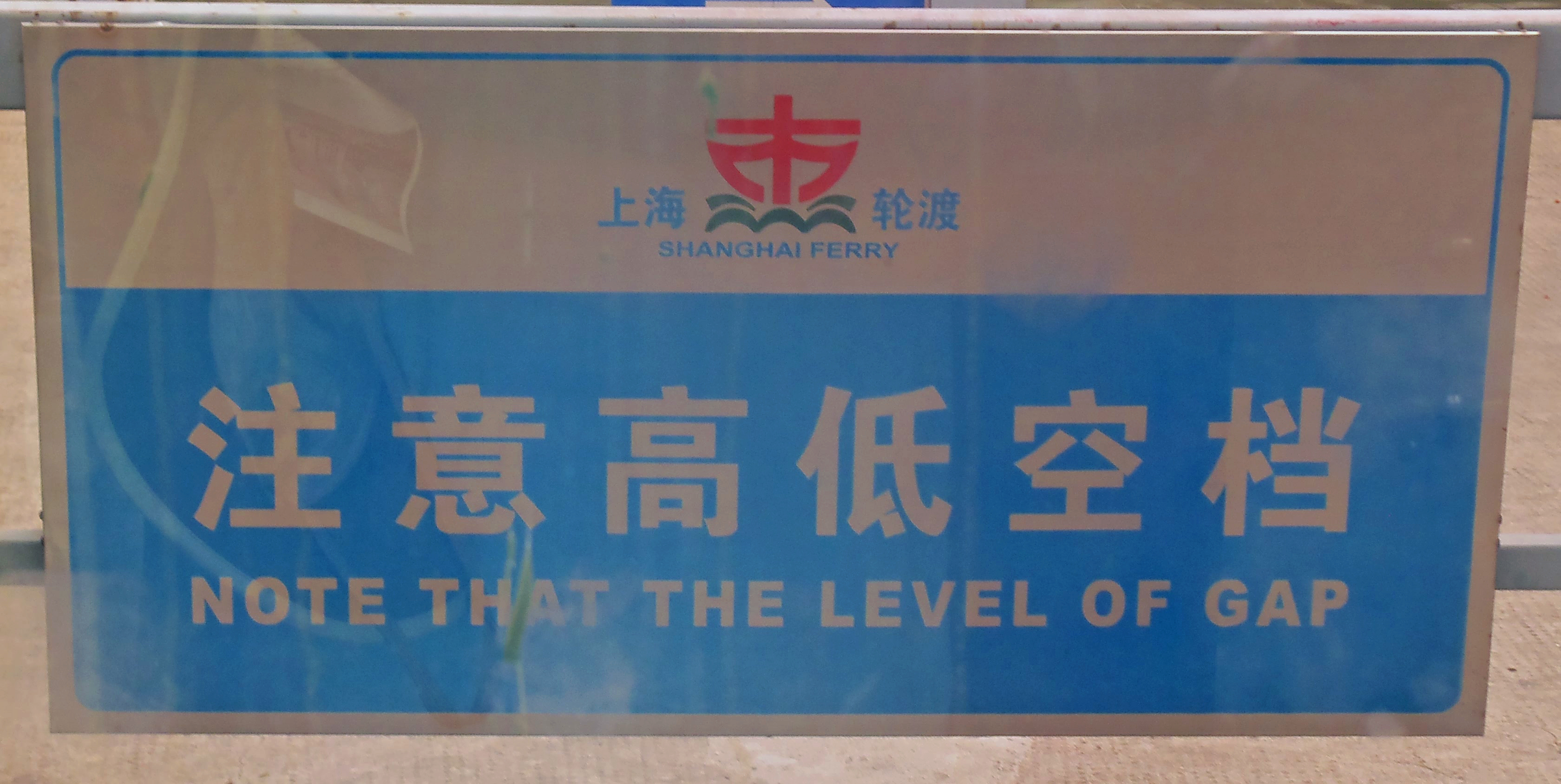
"Note that the level of gap", a sentence fragment in Chinglish caused by an incorrect translation of the phrase "mind the gap" from English to Chinese and back to English

An incomplete sentence, or sentence fragment, is a set of words that does not form a complete sentence, either because it does not express a complete thought or because it lacks some grammatical element, such as a subject or a verb.

An -ing fragment is a type of incomplete sentence containing a word ending in -ing that is a gerund or noun, not a verb, because it lacks a helping verb. An example is, "Swimming in the ocean".

Some prescriptive grammars consider sentences starting with a conjunction such as but or and to be incomplete sentences, but this style prescription has "no historical or grammatical foundation".

== Run-on sentences ==
A run-on sentence is a sentence that consists of two or more independent clauses (i.e. clauses that have not been made dependent through the use of a relative pronoun or a subordinating conjunction) that are joined without appropriate punctuation: the clauses "run on" into confusion. The independent clauses can be "fused", as in "It is nearly half past five we cannot reach town before dark", in which case the two independent clauses might be separated (between "five" and "we") with a period [...five. We...], a comma and conjunction (...five, and we...), or a semicolon (...five; we...). The independent clauses can be joined inadequately with only a comma (the comma splice).

In general, run-on sentences occur when two or more independent clauses are joined without using a coordinating conjunction (i.e. for, and, nor, but, or, yet, so) or correct punctuation (i.e. semicolon, dash, or period). A run-on sentence can be as short as four words (for instance, I drive she walks, or even I drive, she walks) because in those cases, there are two subjects paired with two intransitive verbs. An imperative sentence like "Run walk" can be a run-on even if it has only two words.

While some sources view comma splices as a form of run-on sentences, others limit the term to independent clauses that are joined without punctuation.

According to The American Heritage Dictionary of the English Language, the term "run-on sentence" is also used for "a very long sentence, especially one lacking order or coherence".
