= Dependent statement =

In grammar, a dependent statement is a statement converted into a noun clause, normally, in English, by the addition of that at the beginning, and made dependent on another clause (e.g. as subject or object). For example, the statement I had saved his brother appears as object of the verb knew in the following quotation:

I would he knew that I had saved his brother! (Shakespeare).

The statement They were unprepared is made subject of is in the following:

That they were unprepared is obvious.

Further examples:

Methoughts that I had broken from the Tower (Shakespeare).

His majesty hath straitly given in charge that no man shall have private conference, of what degree soever, with his brother (Shakespeare).

You shall confess that you are both deceived in a good way (Shakespeare).

== Bibliography ==
- Onions, C.T. (1971). Modern English Syntax. Routledge. p. 47. ISBN 978-0-7100-6990-0
