= Independent clause =

Grammatical clause that can be a sentence on its own

In traditional grammar, an independent clause (also known as a main or matrix clause) is a clause that can stand by itself as a simple sentence. An independent clause contains a subject and a predicate and makes sense by itself.

Independent clauses can be joined by using a semicolon or by using a comma followed by a coordinating conjunction (and, but, for, or, nor, so, yet, etc.).

== Examples ==
In the following example sentences, independent clauses are underlined, and conjunctions are in bold.

Single independent clauses:

- I have enough money to buy an ice cream cone.
- My favourite flavour is chocolate.
- Let's go to the shop.

Multiple independent clauses:

- I have enough money to buy an ice cream cone; my favourite flavour is chocolate.
- I have enough money to buy an ice cream cone, **so** let's go to the shop.

== See also ==
- Comma splice
- Conditional sentence
- Dependent clause
- Relative clause
- Run-on sentence
- Sentence clause structure
