= Coordination (linguistics) =

Complex syntactic structure linking two or more elements

In linguistics, coordination is a complex syntactic structure that links together two or more elements; these elements are called conjuncts or conjoins. The presence of coordination is often signaled by the appearance of a coordinator (coordinating conjunction), e.g. and, or, but (in English). The totality of coordinator(s) and conjuncts forming an instance of coordination is called a coordinate structure. The unique properties of coordinate structures have motivated theoretical syntax to draw a broad distinction between coordination and subordination. It is also one of the many constituency tests in linguistics. Coordination is one of the most studied fields in theoretical syntax, but despite decades of intensive examination, theoretical accounts differ significantly and there is no consensus on the best analysis.

== Coordinators ==
A coordinator or a coordinating conjunction, often appears between the conjuncts, usually at least between the penultimate and ultimate conjunct of the coordinate structure. The words and and or are by far the most frequently occurring coordinators in English. Other coordinators occur less often and have unique properties, e.g. but, as well as, then, etc. The coordinator usually serves to link the conjuncts and indicate the presence of a coordinate structure. Depending on the number of coordinators used, coordinate structures can be classified as syndetic, asyndetic, or polysyndetic.

Different types of coordinators are also categorised differently. The table below shows the categories for the coordinators in English:

Coordinator	Category
and	conjunctive coordination
or	disjunctive coordination
but	adversative coordination

== Basic examples ==
Coordination is a very flexible mechanism of syntax. Any given lexical or phrasal category can be coordinated. The examples throughout this article employ the convention whereby the conjuncts of coordinate structures are marked using square brackets and bold script. In the following examples, the coordinate structure includes all the material that follows the left-most square bracket and precedes the right-most square bracket. The coordinator appears in normal script between the conjuncts.

[Sarah] and [Xolani] went to town. - N + N
[The chicken] and [the rice] go well together. - NP + NP
The president will [understand] and [agree]. - V + V
The president will [understand the criticism] and [take action]. - VP + VP
Insects were [in], [on], and [under] the bed. - P + P + P
[After the announcement] but [before the game], there was a celebration. - PP + PP
Susan works [slowly] and [carefully]. - Adv + Adv
Susan works [too slowly] and [overly carefully]. - AdvP + AdvP
We appreciated [that the president understood the criticism] and [that he took action]. - Clause + Clause

Data of this sort could easily be expanded to include every lexical and phrasal category. An important aspect of the above data is that the conjuncts each time are constituents. In other words, the material enclosed in brackets would qualify as a constituent in both phrase structure grammars and dependency grammars.

== Structure of coordination ==
Theoretical accounts of coordination vary in major respects. For instance, approaches to coordination in constituency and dependency differ significantly, and derivational and representational systems are also likely to disagree on many aspects of how coordination should be explained. Derivational accounts, for instance, are more likely to assume transformational mechanisms to "rectify" non-constituent conjuncts (e.g. conjunction reduction and right node raising, as mentioned below).

Even concerning the hierarchical structure of coordinated strings, there is much disagreement. Whether or not coordinate structures should be analyzed in terms of the basic tree conventions employed for subordination is an issue that divides experts. Broadly speaking, there are two options: either a flat or a layered analysis. There are two possibilities for the flat option, both of which are shown here. The a-trees represent the analyses in a constituency-based system, and the b-trees in a dependency-based system:

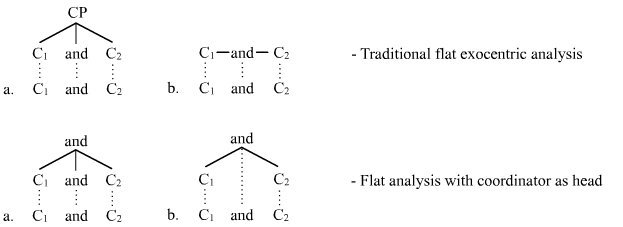

The first two trees present the traditional exocentric analysis. The coordinate structure is deemed exocentric insofar as neither conjunct can be taken to be the sole head, but rather both conjuncts are deemed heads in a sense. The second two trees, where the coordinator is the head, are similar to the first two insofar as the conjuncts are equi-level sisters. These two flat analyses stand in contrast to the following three layered analyses. The constituency-based a-trees appear again on the left, and the dependency-based b-trees on the right:

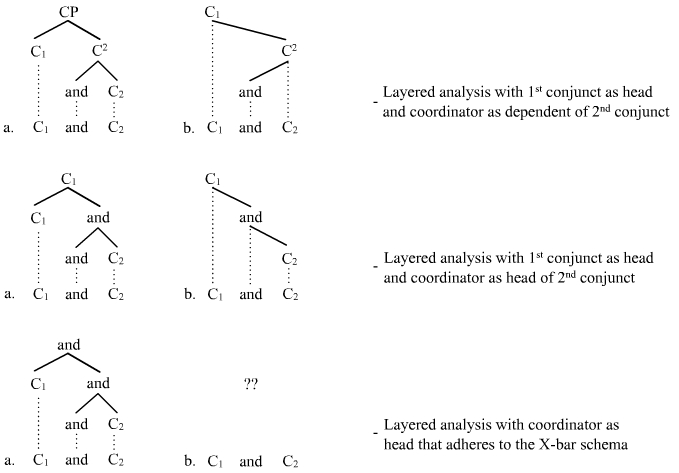

The primary aspect of these layered analyses is that an attempt is being made to adapt the analysis of coordinate structures to the analysis of subordinate structures. The conjuncts in each case are not sister constituents, but rather the first conjunct is in a more prominent (higher) hierarchical position than the second conjunct. The three analyses differ with respect to the presumed head of the entire structure. The third option in terms of the X-bar schema cannot be rendered in terms of dependency because dependency allows a word to project just a single node. There is no way to capture the hierarchical distinction between specifiers and complements in a dependency-based system (but there is always a linear distinction, since specifiers precede complements).

The flat analysis has the benefit that it captures the intuition that coordinate structures are different from subordinate structures at a basic level. The drawback to the flat analysis, however, is that the theory of syntax must be augmented beyond what is necessary for standard subordinate structures. The layered analysis has the advantage that there is no need to augment the syntax with an additional principle of organization, but it has the disadvantage that it does not sufficiently accommodate the intuition that coordination is fundamentally different from subordination.

== Coordination in different languages ==
=== Unique behaviour in English ===
Most coordinate structures are like those just produced above; the coordinated strings are alike in syntactic category. There are a number of unique traits of coordination, however, that demonstrate that what can be coordinated is not limited to the standard syntactic categories. Each of the following subsections briefly draws attention to an unexpected aspect of coordination. These aspects are less than fully understood, despite the attention that coordination has received in theoretical syntax.

==== Nested coordinate structures ====
One coordinate structure can easily be nested inside another. However, this may result in ambiguity, as demonstrated by the following example.

Fred and Bill and Sam came.
a. [Fred] and [Bill] and [Sam] came.
b. [Fred] and [[Bill] and [Sam]] came.
c. [[Fred] and [Bill]] and [Sam] came.

The brackets indicate the three possible readings for the sentence. The (b)- and (c)-readings show one coordinate structure being embedded inside another. Which of the three readings is understood depends on intonation and context. The (b)-reading could be preferred in a situation where Bill and Sam arrived together, but Fred arrived separately. Similarly, the (c)-reading could be preferred in a situation where Fred and Bill arrived together, but Sam arrived separately. That the indicated groupings are indeed possible becomes evident when or is employed:

b'. [Fred] or [Bill and Sam] came.
c'. [Fred and Bill] or [Sam] came.

A theory of coordination needs to be in a position to address nesting of this sort.

==== Mismatch in syntactic category ====
The examples above illustrate that the conjuncts are often alike in syntactic category. There are, though, many instances of coordination where the coordinated strings are not alike, e.g.

Sarah is [a CEO] and [proud of her job]. - NP + AP
Is Jim [conservative] and [a closet Republican]? - A + NP
Bill is [in trouble] and [trying to come up with an excuse]. - PP + VP
Sam works [evenings] and [on weekends]. - Adv + PP
They are leaving [due to the weather] and [because they want to save money]. - PP + Clause

Data like these have been explored in detail. They illustrate that the theory of coordination should not rely too heavily on syntactic category to explain the fact that in most instances of coordination, the coordinated strings are alike. Syntactic function is more important, that is, the coordinated strings should be alike in syntactic function. In the former three sentences here, the coordinated strings are, as complements of the copula is, predicative expressions, and in the latter two sentences, the coordinated strings are adjuncts that are alike in syntactic function (temporal adjunct + temporal adjunct, causal adjunct + causal adjunct).

==== Non-constituent conjuncts ====
The aspect of coordination that is perhaps most vexing for theories of coordination concerns non-constituent conjuncts. Coordination is, namely, not limited to coordinating just constituents, but is also capable of coordinating non-constituent strings:

[When did he] and [why did he] do that?
[She has] but [he has not] understood the task.
Susan [asked you] but [forced me] to read the book on syntax.
[Jill has been promising] but [Fred is actually trying] to solve the problem.
[The old] and [the new] submarines submerged side-by-side.
[Before the first] and [after the second] presentation, there will be coffee.
Fred sent [Uncle Willy chocolates] and [Aunt Samantha earrings].
We expect [Connor to laugh] and [Jilian to cry].

While some of these coordinate structures require a non-standard intonation contour, they can all be acceptable. This situation is problematic for theories of syntax because most of the coordinated strings do not qualify as constituents. Hence since the constituent is widely assumed to be the fundamental unit of syntactic analysis, such data seem to require that the theory of coordination admit additional theoretical apparatus. Two examples of the sort of apparatus that has been posited are so-called conjunction reduction and right node raising (RNR). Conjunction reduction is an ellipsis mechanism that takes non-constituent conjuncts to be complete phrases or clauses at some deep level of syntax. These complete phrases or clauses are then reduced down to their surface appearance by the conjunction reduction mechanism. The traditional analysis of the phenomenon of right node raising assumed that in cases of non-constituent conjuncts, a shared string to the right of the conjuncts is raised out of VP in such a manner that the material in the conjuncts ends up as constituents. The plausibility of these mechanisms is NOT widely accepted as it can be argued that they are ad hoc attempts to solve a problem that plagues theories that take the constituent to be the fundamental unit of syntactic analysis.

Coordination has been widely employed as a test or for the constituent status of a given string, i.e. as a constituency test. In light of non-constituent conjuncts however, the helpfulness of coordination as a diagnostic for identifying constituents can be dubious.

==== Gapping or not? ====
Gapping (and stripping) is an ellipsis mechanism that seems to occur in coordinate structures only. It usually excludes a finite verb from the second conjunct of a coordinate structure and allows further constituents to also be elided from the conjunct. While gapping itself is widely acknowledged to involve ellipsis, which instances of coordination do and do not involve gapping is still a matter of debate. Most theories of syntax agree that gapping is involved in the following cases. A subscript and a smaller font are used to indicate the "gapped" material:

[Brent ate the beans], and [Bill _{ate} the rice]. - Gapping
[You should call me more], and [I _{should call} you _{more}]. - Gapping
[Mary always orders wine], and [Sally _{always orders} beer]. - Gapping

Accounts of gapping and coordination disagree, however, concerning data such as the following:

a. [They saw him first] and [_{they saw} her second]. - Gapping analysis
b. They saw [him first] and [her second]. - Non-gapping analysis

a. [Tanya expects the dog to eat cat food] and [_{she expects} the cat to eat dog food]. - Gapping analysis
b. Tanya expects [the dog to eat cat food] and [the cat to eat dog food]. - Non-gapping analysis

The gapping analysis shown in the a-sentences is motivated above all by the desire to avoid the non-constituent conjuncts associated with the b-sentences. No consensus has been reached about which analysis is better.

==== Forward versus backward sharing ====
Coordination is sensitive to the linear order of words, a fact that is evident with differences between forward and backward sharing. There is a limitation on material that precedes the conjuncts of a coordinate structure that does restrict the material that follows it:

*After Wallace fed [his dog the postman] and [his sheep the milkman] arrived. - Forward sharing fails.
*The man [who built the rocket has] and [who studied robots designed] a dog. - Forward sharing fails.
*After [Sue’s presentation , I was sad] and [Fred’s presentation, I was angry]. - Forward sharing fails.

The star * indicates that the sentence is unacceptable in the language. Each of these coordinate structures is disallowed. The underline draws attention to a constituent that mostly precedes the coordinate structure but that the initial conjunct "cuts into". There is apparently a restriction on the constituents that mostly precede a coordinate structure. The same restriction does not limit similar constituents that mostly follow the coordinate structure:

[She stated the strengths], and [he mentioned the weaknesses] of the explanation. - Backward sharing succeeds.
[Larry put a flier on], and [Sue slipped one under] the door. - Backward sharing succeeds
Sally [arrived just before the speaker initiated], and [left right after he finished] his speech. - Backward sharing succeeds

The underline now marks a constituent that mostly follows the coordinate structure. Unlike with the first three examples, the coordinate structure in these three examples can cut into the underlined constituent.

==== Extraction ====
In Transformational Grammar, the interaction of coordination and extraction (e.g. wh-fronting) has generated a lot of interest. The Coordinate Structure Constraint is the property of coordinate structures that prevents extraction of a single conjunct or from a single conjunct. Coordinate structures are said to be strong islands for extraction. For example:

*Who did you see [Fred] and [ ]? - Failed extraction of an entire conjunct
*Who did you see [ ] and Susan? - Failed extraction of an entire conjunct

*Which action did the president understand [the criticism] and [take]? - Failed extraction out of a single conjunct

These attempts at coordination fail because extraction cannot affect just one conjunct of a coordinate structure. If extraction occurs out of both conjuncts in a like fashion, however, the coordinate structure is acceptable. This trait of coordination is referred to as the Across-the-Board Constraint. For example:

What does [Sarah like] and [Xolani hate]? - Across-the-board extraction of What

There are other apparent exceptions to the Coordinate Structure Constraint and the Across-the-Board generalization, and their integration to existing syntactic theory has been a long-standing disciplinary desideratum.

==== Pseudo-coordination ====
In pseudo-coordinative constructions, the coordinator, generally and, appears to have a subordinating function. It occurs in many languages and is sometimes known as "hendiadys", and it is often, but not always, used to convey a pejorative or idiomatic connotation. Among the Germanic languages, pseudo-coordination occurs in English, Afrikaans, Norwegian, Danish and Swedish. Pseudo-coordination appears to be absent in Dutch and German. The pseudo-coordinative construction is limited to a few verbs. In English, these verbs are typically go, try, and sit. In other languages, typical pseudo-coordinative verbs and/or hendiadys predicates are egressive verbs (e.g. go) and verbs of body posture (e.g. sit, stand and lie down).

Why don't you go and jump in the lake
I will try and jump in the lake
The pupils sat and read their textbooks

A typical property of pseudo-coordinative constructions is that, unlike ordinary coordination, they appear to violate the Across-the-Board extraction property (see above). In other words, it is possible to extract from one of the conjuncts.

What did she go and jump into?
What did she try and jump in?
Which textbooks did the pupils sit and read?

It has been argued that pseudo-coordination is not a unitary phenomenon. Even in a single language such as English, the predicate try exhibits different pseudo-coordination properties to other predicates and other predicates such as go and sit can instantiate a number of different pseudo-coordinative construction types. On the other hand, it has been argued that at least some different types of pseudo-coordination can be analyzed using ordinary coordination as opposed to stipulating that pseudo-coordinative and is a subordinator; the differences between the various constructions derive from the level of structure that is coordinated e.g. coordination of heads, coordination of VP, etc.

=== Japanese ===
==== to - coordinator for nominals ====
In Japanese, the particle と to, which can be translated as and in English, is used as a coordinator of nominals (a noun, noun phrase or any word that functions as a noun). It cannot be used to coordinate other word categories such as adjectives and verbs. Different word categories require different coordinators. We will discuss the basic use of these coordinators in Japanese. Below is a simple example of nominal coordination in Japanese.

メアリー -は [りんご-と バナナ] -を 買った
Mary -wa [ringo-to banana] -o katta
Mary -TOP [apple-and banana] -ACC bought
Mary bought apples and bananas.

To can also be used to coordinate two conjuncts that are not syntactic constituents. In the example below, the conjuncts each include an in direct object, a direct object, and a quantifier.

メアリー -が {[[トム-に} りんご-を 二-つ]-と [ボブ-に バナナ-を 三-本]] あげた
Mary -ga {[[Tom-ni} ringo-o futa-tsu]-to [Bob-ni banana-o san-bon]] ageta
Mary -NOM {[[Tom-to} apple-ACC two-CL]-and [Bob-to banana-ACC three-CL]] gave
Mary gave two apples to Tom and three bananas to Bob.

==== -te - coordinator for adjectives ====
There are two classes of adjectives in Japanese: i-adjectives and na-adjectives. The -te suffix will change according to the classes of the adjectives.

	Normal form	-Te form
i-adjectives	安い yasui	安くて yasukute
na-adjectives	安全な anzenna	安全で anzende

When i-adjectives are in -te form, the final い -i is dropped and くて -kute is added as a suffix instead. On the contrary, when na-adjectives are in -te form, the final な -na is dropped and で -de is added as a suffix.

As we can see, instead of a particle, a suffix is added to the first adjective to show coordination of adjectives. Below is a simple example of adjectival coordination in Japanese. In (3), both adjectives are i-adjectives, while in (4) both adjectives are na-adjectives.

ラーメン -は [安-くて 美味しい]
ramen -wa [yasu-kute oishii]
ramen -TOP [cheap-and tasty]
Ramen is cheap and tasty.

この 道 -は [安全-で 綺麗だ]
kono michi -wa [anzen-de {kirei da}]
this road -TOP [safe-and beautiful]
This road is safe and beautiful.

==== -te - coordinator for verbs ====
There are three classes of verbs in Japanese: ru-verbs, u-verbs and irregular verbs. Similar to Japanese adjectives, the -te suffix will change because of the class of the verbs. The te-form of verbs is a lot more complicated than that of adjectives, for the purpose of this Wikipedia page, we will just discuss the coordinator how it's used in Japanese.

メアリー -は [食べ-て 飲んだ]
Mary -wa [tabe-te nonda]
Mary -TOP [ate-and drank]
Mary ate and drank.

=== Afroasiatic: Hausa ===
==== dà/kóo - coordination for nominals and adjectives ====
In Hausa, dà means and in English, while kóo means or. It is used as a coordinator for nominals. Unlike Japanese, articles dà and kóo can be used to coordinate other word categories like adjectives and nominalised verbs. The number of nouns that can be conjoined to dà is unlimited. The tables below shows a simple example of simple nominal coordination in Hausa.

Àbêokùtá dà/kóo Àbúuja dà Ilòor̃í dà/kóo Ìbàadàn
Abeokuta and/or Abuja and Ilorin and/or Ibadan
Abeokuta and/or Abuja and Ilorin and/or Ibadan

Wánnàn rìigáa tánàà dà kálàa jáa dà/kóo kóor̃èe
This dress 3SG.F.PROG with colour red and/or green
This dress has red and green colour

Cîn náamà-n àládèe dà shân gíyàa
Eating meat-of pig and drinking beer
Eating and drinking beer

==== kóo - Coordination for verbs ====
VP sentences are coordinated asyndetically. The table below show examples of this.

Hàbîb yáa háu {Mount Patti} (*dà/kóo) yáa núunàa mánà kòogi-n Íísà (*dà/kóo) yáa gyáarà móotà -r- sà
Habib 3SG.M.PFV climb {Mount Patti} and/or 3SG.M.PFV show us river-GEN Niger and/or 3SG.M.PFV repair car -GEN- his
Habib has climbed Mount Patti, has showed use the river Niger, has repaired his car

Kóo can also only appear between the first and second, or the second and third conjunct. The tables below show examples of this.

Kóo Hàbîb yáa tàfí Lákwájà kóo yáa tàfí Sákkwátó
Either Habib 3SG.F.PROG. travel Lokajal or 3SG.F.PROG. travel Sokoto
Either Habib went to Lokoja or he went to Sokoto

Hàbîb yá háu {Mount Patti} kóo yáa núunàa mánà kòogi-n Íísà kóo yáa gyáarà móotà-r-sà
Habib 3SG.M.PFV.SBJV. climb {Mount Patti} or 3SG.M.PFV. show us river-GEN Niger or 3SG.M.PFV repair car-GEN-his
Habib climbed Mount Patti either to show us river Niger or to repair his car.

=== Sinitic: Mandarin ===
==== Floating coordinators ====
Standard Mandarin Chinese allows floating coordinators. Essentially, these consist of coordinators in the language that cannot appear to the left of or inside the first conjunct. Instead, they may only appear between two conjuncts or inside the second. This is demonstrated in the following table in which the floating coordinator ke(shi) may occur between the two conjuncts in the first example or inside the second conjunct in the second example. However, when ke(shi) appears inside the first conjunct, as in the third example, or to the left of the first conjunct, as in the fourth example, the sentence becomes ungrammatical.

Example of floating coordinators in Mandarin Chinese

Baoyu yao tiaowu, ke(shi) wo yao hui- jia
Baoyu want dance but I want return- home
Baoyu wants to dance but I want to return home

Baoyu yao tiaowu, wo ke(shi) yao hui- jia
Baoyu want dance I but want return- home
Baoyu wants to dance but I want to return home

*Baoyu ke(shi) yao tiaowu, wo yao hui- jia
*Baoyu but want dance I want return- home

*Ke(shi) Baoyu yao tiaowu, wo yao hui- jia
*but Baoyu want dance I want return- home

The distribution of the coordinator yu(shi), meaning and thus, bears some similarity to that of ke(shi) but restricts other coordinators from appearing before the conjunct in which it occurs. Yu(shi) may precede or follow the second conjunct but never precedes the first conjunct.

The distribution of yu(shi) in Mandarin Chinese

Baoyu yi guli yushi Daiyu huifu -le zixin
Baoyu once encourage and Daiyu recover -PRF confidence
Baoyu encouraged her, and thus Daiyu recovered her confidence

Baoyu yi guli, Daiyu yushi huifu -le zixin
Baoyu once encourage Diayu and recover -PRF confidence
Baoyu encouraged her, and thus Daiyu recovered her confidence

(*yushi) Baoyu (*yushi) yi guli, Daiyu huifu -le zixin
and Baoyu and one encourage Daiyu recover -PRF confidence

==== Lexical Integrity Hypothesis in Mandarin Chinese ====
Standard Mandarin Chinese also follows the Lexical Integrity Hypothesis, which has an effect on syntactic coordination in the language. The second example shown below (marked with an asterisk) is ungrammatical because, as correctly predicted by the hypothesis, syntactic transformations are not applicable to word-internal structures. Thus, the second example shown below is not allowed and is thus marked with an asterisk.

Example of Syntactic Coordination in Mandarin Chinese

Lisi shi yi ge [lu-shi]_{NP} jian [yi-shi]_{NP}
Lisi AUX one CL law-teacher and heal-teacher
Lisi is a lawyer and doctor

*Lisi shi yi ge [lu-jian-yi]-shi]_{N}
*Lisi AUX one CL law-and-heal-teacher

However, Verb-Object compounds are an exception to this hypothesis. This is demonstrated in the following example in which the V-O forms chi-hun and chi-su permit the coordination of the word-internal elements hun and su, thereby not following the hypothesis.

Example of Exception to Lexical Integrity Hypothesis in Mandarin

Zhangsan shi -bu- shi chi- hun- han- su dou keyi?
Zhangsan AUX -no- AUX eat- meat- and- veggies all allowed?
Is it that Zhangsan can eat non-vegetarian or vegetarian meals?

== See also ==
- Constituent
- Dependency grammar
- Discourse marker
- Gapping
- Phrase structure grammar
- Right node raising
- Subordination
