= Sentence (linguistics) =

Words expressing a complete thought

In linguistics and grammar, a sentence is a linguistic expression, such as the English example "The quick brown fox jumps over the lazy dog" (a pangram). In traditional grammar, it is typically defined as a string of words that expresses a thought, or as a unit consisting of a subject and predicate. In non-functional linguistics it is typically defined as a maximal unit of syntactic structure such as a constituent. In functional linguistics, it is defined as a unit of written texts delimited by graphological features such as upper-case letters and markers such as periods, question marks, and exclamation marks. This notion contrasts with a curve, which is delimited by phonologic features such as pitch and loudness and markers such as pauses; and with a clause, which is a sequence of words that represents some process going on throughout time. A sentence can include words grouped meaningfully to express a statement, question, exclamation, request, command, or suggestion.

== Typical associates ==
=== Clauses ===
A sentence is typically associated with a clause. A clause can either be a clause simplex or a clause complex. A clause simplex represents a single process going on through time. A clause complex represents a logical relation between two or more processes and is thus composed of two or more clause simplexes.

A clause (simplex) typically contains a predication structure with a subject noun phrase and a finite verb. Although the subject is usually a noun phrase, other kinds of phrases (such as gerund phrases) work as well, and some languages allow subjects to be omitted. In the examples below, the subject of the outmost clause simplex is in italics and the subject of boiling is in square brackets. There is clause embedding in the second and third examples.

[Water] boils at 100 degrees Celsius.
It is quite interesting that [water] boils at 100 degrees Celsius.
The fact that [water] boils at 100 degrees Celsius is quite interesting.

There are two types of clauses: independent and non-independent/interdependent. An independent clause realises a speech act such as a statement, a question, a command or an offer. A non-independent clause does not realise any act. A non-independent clause (simplex or complex) is usually logically related to other non-independent clauses. Together, they usually constitute a single independent clause (complex). For that reason, non-independent clauses are also called interdependent. For instance, the non-independent clause because I have no friends is related to the non-independent clause I don't go out in I don't go out, because I have no friends. The whole clause complex is independent because it realises a statement. What is stated is the causal nexus between having no friend and not going out. When such a statement is acted out, the fact that the speaker doesn't go out is already established, therefore it cannot be stated. What is still open and under negotiation is the reason for that fact. The causal nexus is represented by the independent clause complex and not by the two interdependent clause simplexes.

See also copula for the consequences of the verb to be on the theory of sentence structure.

== Classification ==
=== By structure ===
One scheme for classifying English sentences is by clause structure, the number and types of clauses in the sentence with finite verbs.

- A simple sentence consists of a single independent clause with no dependent clauses.
- A compound sentence consists of multiple independent clauses with no dependent clauses. These clauses are joined together using conjunctions, punctuation, or both.
- A complex sentence consists of one independent clause and at least one dependent clause.
- A compound–complex sentence (or complex–compound sentence) consists of multiple independent clauses, at least one of which has at least one dependent clause.

=== By function or speech act ===
Sentences can also be classified based on the speech act which they perform. For instance, English sentence types can be described as follows:

- A declarative sentence makes a statement or assertion:
  - "You are my friend."
- An interrogative sentence raises a question:
  - "Are you my friend?"
- An imperative sentence makes a command:
  - "Be my friend!"
- An exclamative or exclamatory sentence raises an exclamation:
  - "What a good friend you are!"

The form (declarative, interrogative, imperative, or exclamative) and meaning (statement, question, command, or exclamation) of a sentence usually match, but not always. For instance, the interrogative sentence "Can you pass me the salt?" is not intended to express a question but rather to express a command. Likewise, the interrogative sentence "Can't you do anything right?" is not intended to express a question on the listener's ability, but rather to make an exclamation about the listener's lack of ability, also called a rhetorical question.

=== Major and minor sentences ===
A major sentence is a regular sentence; it has a subject and a predicate, e.g. "I have a ball." In this sentence, one can change the persons, e.g. "We have a ball." However, a minor sentence is an irregular type of sentence that does not contain a main clause, e.g. "Mary!", "Precisely so.", "Next Tuesday evening after it gets dark." Other examples of minor sentences are headings, stereotyped expressions ("Hello!"), emotional expressions ("Wow!"), proverbs, etc. These can also include nominal sentences like "The more, the merrier." These mostly omit a main verb for the sake of conciseness but may also do so in order to intensify the meaning around the nouns.

Sentences that comprise a single word are called word sentences, and the words themselves sentence words.

== Length ==
The 1980s saw a renewed surge in interest in sentence length, primarily in relation to "other syntactic phenomena".

One definition of the average sentence length of a prose passage is the ratio of the number of words to the number of sentences. The textbook Mathematical Linguistics, by András Kornai, suggests that in "journalistic prose the median sentence length is above 15 words". The average length of a sentence generally serves as a measure of sentence difficulty or complexity. In general, as the average sentence length increases, the complexity of the sentences also increases.

Another definition of "sentence length" is the number of clauses in the sentence, whereas the "clause length" is the number of phones in the clause.

Research by Erik Schils and Pieter de Haan by sampling five texts showed that two adjacent sentences are more likely to have similar lengths than two non-adjacent sentences, and almost certainly have a similar length when in a work of fiction. This countered the theory that "authors may aim at an alternation of long and short sentences". Sentence length, as well as word difficulty, are both factors in the readability of a sentence; however, other factors, such as the presence of conjunctions, have been said to "facilitate comprehension considerably".

== See also ==
- Clause
- Constituent
- Discourse
- Periodic sentence
- Sentence arrangement
- Sentence function
- Syntax
- T-unit
- Utterance
- Conditional sentence
