= Chris Baldick =

British academic

Professor Chris Baldick (born 1954) is a British academic who teaches at Goldsmiths College, University of London. He has worked in the fields of literary criticism, literary theory, literary history and literary terminology. He was previously Senior Lecturer in English at Edge Hill College of Higher Education in Ormskirk.

He is the son of Robert Baldick, a scholar of French literature and translator.

== Selected publications ==
- The Decadence Reader, ed. with Jane Desmarais. Manchester: Manchester University Press, 2010.
- The Oxford Dictionary of Literary Terms (Online Version) (4th ed.). Oxford University Press. 2015. ISBN 9780191783234.
- The Concise Oxford Dictionary of Literary Terms ISBN 978-0-19-860883-7
- The Oxford English Literary History, volume 10 (1910–1940): The Modern Movement ISBN 978-0-19-928834-2
- Criticism and Literary Theory 1890 to the Present ISBN 978-0-582-03381-8
- The Oxford Book of Gothic Tales (ed) ISBN 978-0-19-286219-8
- In Frankenstein's Shadow: Myth, Monstrosity, and Nineteenth-Century Writing ISBN 978-0-19-812249-4
- The Social Mission of English Criticism 1848-1932 ISBN 978-0-19-812979-0
