= Conjunction (grammar) =

Part of speech that connects two words, sentences, phrases, or clauses

In grammar, a conjunction (abbreviated conj or cnj) is a part of speech that connects words, phrases, or clauses, which are called its conjuncts. That description is vague enough to overlap with those of other parts of speech because what constitutes a "conjunction" must be defined for each language. In English, a given word may have several senses and in some contexts be a preposition but a conjunction in others, depending on the syntax. For example, after is a preposition in "he left after the fight" but a conjunction in "he left after they fought".

In general, a conjunction is an invariant (non-inflecting) grammatical particle that stands between conjuncts. In English, a conjunction may be placed at the beginning of a sentence, but some superstition about the practice persists. The definition may be extended to idiomatic phrases that behave as a unit and perform the same function, e.g. "as well as", "provided that".

A simple literary example of a conjunction is "the truth of nature, and the power of giving interest" (Samuel Taylor Coleridge's Biographia Literaria).

== Separation of clauses ==
Commas are often used to separate clauses. In English, a comma is used to separate a dependent clause from the independent clause if the dependent clause comes first: After I fed the cat, I brushed my clothes. (Compare this with I brushed my clothes after I fed the cat.) A relative clause takes commas if it is non-restrictive, as in I cut down all the trees, which were over six feet tall. (Without the comma, this would mean that only the trees more than six feet tall were cut down.) Some style guides prescribe that two independent clauses joined by a coordinating conjunction (for, and, nor, but, or, yet, so) must be separated by a comma placed before the conjunction. In the following sentences, where the second clause is independent (because it can stand alone as a sentence), the comma is considered by those guides to be necessary:

- Mary walked to the party, but she was unable to walk home.
- Designer clothes are silly, and I can't afford them anyway.
- Don't push that button, or twelve tons of high explosives will go off right under our feet!

In the following sentences, where the second half of the sentence is not an independent clause (because it does not contain an explicit subject), those guides prescribe that the comma be omitted:

- Mary walked to the party but was unable to walk home.
- I think designer clothes are silly and can't afford them anyway.

However, such guides permit the comma to be omitted if the second independent clause is very short, typically when the second independent clause is an imperative, as in:

- Sit down and shut up.

The above guidance is not universally accepted or applied. Long coordinate clauses are nonetheless usually separated by commas:

- She had very little to live on, but she would never have dreamed of taking what was not hers.

A comma between clauses may change the connotation, reducing or eliminating ambiguity. In the following examples, the thing in the first sentence that is very relaxing is the cool day, whereas in the second sentence it is the walk, since the introduction of commas makes "on a cool day" parenthetical:

They took a walk on a cool day that was very relaxing.

They took a walk, on a cool day, that was very relaxing.

If another prepositional phrase is introduced, ambiguity increases, but when commas separate each clause and phrase, the restrictive clause can remain a modifier of the walk:

They took a walk in the park on a cool day that was very relaxing.

They took a walk, in the park, on a cool day, that was very relaxing.

In some languages, such as German and Polish, stricter rules apply on comma use between clauses, with dependent clauses always being set off with commas, and commas being generally proscribed before certain coordinating conjunctions.

The joining of two independent sentences with a comma and no conjunction (as in "It is nearly half past five, we cannot reach town before dark.") is known as a comma splice and is sometimes considered an error in English; in most cases a semicolon should be used instead. A comma splice should not be confused, though, with the literary device called asyndeton, in which coordinating conjunctions are purposely omitted for a specific stylistic effect.

== Etymology ==
Beginning in the 17th century, an element of a conjunction was known as a conjunct. A conjunction itself was then called a connective. That archaic term, however, diminished in usage during the early 20th century. In its place, the terms coordinating conjunction (coined in the mid-19th century) and correlative conjunction (coined in the early 19th century) became more commonly used.

== Coordinating conjunctions ==
Coordinating conjunctions, also called conjunction referential markers and coordinators, are conjunctions that join, or coordinate, two or more items (such as words, main clauses, or sentences) of equal syntactic importance. In English, the mnemonic acronym FANBOYS can be used to remember the most commonly used coordinators: for, and, nor, but, or, yet, and so. These are not the only coordinating conjunctions; various others are used, including: "and nor" (British), "but nor" (British), "neither" ("They don't gamble, neither do they smoke"), "no more" ("They don't gamble, no more do they smoke"), and "only" ("I would go, only I don't have time"). Types of coordinating conjunctions include cumulative conjunctions, adversative conjunctions, alternative conjunctions, and illative conjunctions.

Here are some examples of coordinating conjunctions in English and their functions:

- For – an illative (i.e. inferential), presents rationale ("They do not gamble or smoke, for they are ascetics.")
- And – a cumulative, adds non-contrasting items or ideas ("They gamble, and they smoke.")
- Nor – presents an alternative non-contrasting (also negative) idea ("They do not gamble, nor do they smoke.")
- But – an adversative, presents a contrast or exception ("They gamble, but they don't smoke.")
- Or – presents an alternative non-contrasting item or idea ("Every day they gamble, or they smoke.")
- Yet – an adversative, presents a strong contrast or exception that it hasn't happened ("They gamble, yet they don't smoke.")
- So – an illative (i.e. inferential), presents a consequence ("He gambled well last night, so he smoked a cigar to celebrate.")

== Correlative conjunctions ==
Correlative conjunctions are conjunctions within a syntax that aggregates or contrasts correlated actions, characteristics, or items in the manner of:

1. The use of whether paired with or, as well as if paired with then as conditional conjunctions, e.g. -

- "Vegetables are nutritious whether you love them or you hate them."
- "If you can't afford it, then don't buy it."

2. A nominal phrase headed by a negating determiner paired with an ensuing nominal phrase headed by nor, e.g., "The suites convey neither corporate coldness nor warmth."

3. An adjective (or adjectival phrase) or an adverb (or an adverbial phrase) paired with an ensuing conjunction, e.g. -

- "Successes that are as scattered as they are rare."
- "He ran both far and fast."
- "She's either a singer or an actress."
- "A puppy that's not only cute but also smart."
- "Neither the caller’s name nor the number was visible."
- "Just as we left, so we also decided never to return."
- "There are as many dogs as there are cats."
- "No sooner had we received the call than we left the house."
- "I'd rather flee than fight."
- "It's not a frog but rather a tadpole."

== Conjunctions of time ==
Examples:

after	We'll do that after you do this.
as long as	That's fine as long as you agree to our conditions.
as soon as	We'll get to that as soon as we finish this.
by the time	He had left by the time you arrived.
long before	We'll be gone long before you arrive.
now that	We can get going now that they have left.
once	We'll have less to worry about once the boss leaves.
since	We haven't been able to upload our work since the network went down.
till	Please hold on till the server reboots.
until	We are waiting until you send us the confirmation.
when	They can do what they want when they want.
whenever	There is a good chance of rain whenever there are clouds in the sky.
while	I really appreciate you waiting while I finish up.

== Subordinating conjunctions ==
Subordinating conjunctions, also called subordinators, are conjunctions that introduce content, relative, and adverbial clauses as subordinate ones, and join them to other clauses, whether independent or dependent. The most common subordinating conjunctions in English include after, although, as, as far as, as if, as long as, as soon as, as though, because, before, even if, even though, every time, if, in order that, since, so, so that, than, that, though, unless, until, when, whenever, where, whereas, wherever, and while.

A complementizer is a subordinating conjunction that introduces a content clause (that is, a clause that is a complement of the verb phrase, instead of the more typical nominal subject or object): e.g. "I wonder whether he'll be late. I hope that he'll be on time". Some subordinating conjunctions, when used to introduce a phrase instead of a full clause, become prepositions with identical meanings.

Relativizers are subordinators that introduce relative clauses.

The subordinating conjunction performs two important functions within a sentence: marking the higher rank of the independent clause and transiting between the two clauses’ ideas by indicating the nexus of time, place, or cause. Subordinators therefore structure the relationship between the clauses.

In many verb-final languages, subordinate clauses must precede the main clause on which they depend. The equivalents to the subordinating conjunctions of non-verb-final languages such as English are either

- clause-final conjunctions (e.g. in Japanese); or
- suffixes attached to the verb, and not separate words

Such languages often lack conjunctions as a part of speech, because:

- the form of the verb used is formally nominalised and cannot occur in an independent clause
- the clause-final conjunction or suffix attached to the verb is a marker of case and is also used in nouns to indicate certain functions. In this sense, the subordinate clauses of these languages have much in common with postpositional phrases.

In other West Germanic languages like German and Dutch, the word order after a subordinating conjunction is different from that in an independent clause, e.g. in Dutch want ('for') is coordinating, but omdat ('because') is subordinating. The clause after the coordinating conjunction has normal word order, but the clause after the subordinating conjunction has verb-final word order. Compare:

Hij gaat naar huis, want hij is ziek. ('He goes home, for he is ill.')
Hij gaat naar huis, omdat hij ziek is. ('He goes home, because he is ill.')

Similarly, in German, denn ('for') is coordinating, but weil ('because') is subordinating:

Er geht nach Hause, denn er ist krank. ('He goes home, for he is ill.')
Er geht nach Hause, weil er krank ist. ('He goes home, because he is ill.')

== Starting a sentence ==
It is now generally agreed that a sentence may begin with a coordinating conjunction like and, but, or yet. While some people consider this usage improper, Follett's Modern American Usage labels its prohibition a "supposed rule without foundation" and a "prejudice [that] lingers from a bygone time."

Some associate this belief with their early school days. One conjecture is that it results from young children being taught to avoid simple sentences starting with and and being encouraged to use more complex structures with subordinating conjunctions. In the words of Bryan A. Garner, the "widespread belief ... that it is an error to begin a sentence with a conjunction such as and, but, or so has no historical or grammatical foundation", and good writers have frequently started sentences with conjunctions.

There is also a misleading guideline that a sentence should never begin with because. Because is a subordinating conjunction and introduces a dependent clause. It may start a sentence when the main clause follows the dependent clause.

=== Examples ===
- "And now we have Facebook and Twitter and Wordpress and Tumblr and all those other platforms that take our daily doings and transform them into media."
- "So any modern editor who is not paranoid is a fool".
- "And strikes are protected globally, existing in many of the countries with labour laws outside the Wagner Act model."

== See also ==
- Asyndeton
- Cohesion (linguistics)
- Conjunctive adverb
- Conjunctive mood, sometimes used with conjunctions
- Genitive connector
- Logical conjunction
- Logical disjunction
- Polysyndeton
- Relativizer
- Serial comma – the comma used immediately before a coordinating conjunction preceding the final item in a list of three or more items
- So (word)
- Syndeton
