= Adverbial phrase =

Type of phrase in grammar

In linguistics, an adverbial phrase ("AdvP") is a multi-word expression operating adverbially: its syntactic function is to modify other expressions, including verbs, adjectives, adverbs, adverbials, and sentences. Some grammars use the label adverb phrase to denote an adverbial phrase composed entirely of adverbs versus an adverbial phrase, which might not contain an adverb.

Adverbial phrases can be divided into two types: complementary phrases and modifying phrases. For example, very well is a complementary adverbial phrase that complements "sang" in the sentence "She sang very well". More specifically, the adverbial phrase very well contains two adverbs, very and well: while well qualifies the verb to convey information about the manner of singing. By contrast, almost always is a modifying adverbial phrase that modifies "skip" in the sentence "I almost always skip breakfast."

The following examples illustrate some of the most common types of adverbial phrases. All adverbial phrases appear in bold; when relevant, the head of each adverbial phrase appears in square brackets.

== Degree adverbial phrases ==
The heads of each of the following adverbial phrases are degree adverbials (written "Deg" in syntactic trees). Degree adverbials modify adjacent adverbs (that is, an adverb that is lower in the syntactic tree than the degree adverbial). Degree adverbials are commonly used in English to convey the intensity, degree, or focusing of an adjacent adverb. In most cases, a degree adverbial is used to modify an adverb in an adverbial phrase: for example, in (1) the degree adverbial very modifies the adverb quickly; in (2) the degree adverbial extremely modifies the adverb hard; in (3) the degree adverbial really modifies the adverb well; and in (4), the degree adverbial so modifies the adverb soon.

- (1) They repaired my car **[very] quickly**.
- (2) He worked **[extremely] hard** in the game.
- (3) She did **[really] well** in her race.
- (4) Why are you leaving **[so] soon**?

== Modifying adverbial phrases ==
Modifying adverbial phrases combine with a sentence, and the removal of the adverbial phrase yields a well-formed sentence. For example, in (5) the modifying adverbial phrase in an hour can be removed, and the sentence remains well-formed (e.g., I'll go to bed); in (6) the modifying AdvP three hours later can be omitted, and the sentence remains well-formed (e.g., We arrived); and in (7), the modifying AdvP before long can be omitted, and the sentence remains well-formed (e.g. The situation had been resolved). Just as adjective phrases function attributively to give additional information about an adjacent noun, the modifying adverbial phrases illustrated in (5) to (7) function as secondary predicates that give additional temporal information about the sentence.

- (5) **In an hour** I'll go to bed.
- (6) **Three hours later** we arrived .
- (7) **Before long** the situation had been resolved.

== Complement adverbial phrases ==
Complement adverbial phrases are much less common than their modifying counterparts. Adverbial phrases functioning as complements usually arise when an adverb licenses a complement as a selectional requirement. Nearly all of these complements license an adjoining prepositional phrase. Below are a few examples of complement adverbial phrases.

- (8) Purchase of State vehicles is handled **[similarly] to all State purchases**.
- (9) Foreign firms in US markets are treated **[equally] with their US counterparts**.

== Distinguishing adverbs, adverbial phrases, and adverbial clauses ==
The following sentences illustrate the difference between adverbs, adverbial phrases, and adverbial clauses.

- (10) I'll go to bed **soon**.
- (11) I'll go to bed **in an hour**.
- (12) I'll go to bed **when I've finished my book**.

In the first example, "soon" is an adverb (as distinct from a noun or a verb), which is a type of adverbial. In the second sentence, the modifying phrase "in an hour" has the same syntactic function (that is, to act adverbially and modify the base of the sentence "I'll go to bed"), though it does not contain an adverb. This modifying phrase includes a preposition and a determiner phrase, and functions as an adverbial, thus making it an adverbial phrase. In the third example, we see a whole clause functioning as an adverbial; it is termed an adverbial clause.

== Distribution ==
Functionally, the term adverbial refers to all structures that can take the position of an adverb on a phrase structure level. Adverbs modify the functional categories that occur in a sentence and may also be treated as predicates which are functionally open and require one or more arguments to be satisfied. It has been argued that the distribution of adverbs is largely conditioned by their lexical nature or thematic properties.

=== Classes of adverbials ===
Main classes of adverbials are used to distinguish the functional properties of the adverbs within the phrase. Each class has subcategories, that refer more specifically to the syntactic and semantic properties of the adverbial. There is no distinct terminology for these classes used universally in literature, though adverbials are often classified into their functional categories. The major classes of adverbials are adjunct, disjunct and conjunct.

1. Adjunct:
  referring to information of the action or state in the clause or aspects of things within the real world.
2. Conjunct:
  contextualizes relationships between text. Provides a connective function.
  (i.e. furthermore, to begin with, however)
3. Disjunct:
  conveys a speaker's evaluation of something
  ( i.e. probably, fortunately)
4. Subjunct:
  has a subordinate role relative to other clauses in the structure.
  often referring to viewpoint, focus, or degree adverbials

The class of subjunct is usually placed within adjunct class as it is difficult to distinguish between the two.

The subcategories for adverbials have more universally used terminology and often refer to the nature of the adverb within each phrase. Most literature focuses on the specific categories of adjunct adverbials.

=== Subcategories for adverbials ===
Adjunct adverbials are the most often discussed class of adverbials, when discussing distribution in English. Complement adverbials are also seen to display similar attributes as adjuncts. Distinguishing between these is a matter of the overt realization of the phrase and is discussed below. The most recognizable subcategories for adjunct adverbials would be.:

1. Time (answers the question 'When?')
  She will be arriving **in a short time.**
2. Place (answers the question Where?')
  She is waiting **near the wall.**
3. Manner (answers the question 'How?')
  They are discussing the matter **in a civilized way.**

More possible subcategories of adjunct adverbials are: degree, speaker-oriented, duration, focusing, viewpoint, modality and frequency.

==== Linking ====
Conjunct adverbials, sometimes called linking adverbials, are used to connect clauses together and surface in a clause-initial position in English.

On Tuesday there is a big party; however, I wasn't invited.

==== Evaluative ====
Disjunct adverbials, also referred to as modal adverbials, have subcategories which relay a speakers interpretation of what appears lower in the clause.

In my opinion, syntax is confusing.

Subjunct adverbials are not often discussed as a class of its own in literature. As the distinction of these subcategories as subjunctive depend on the role the adverbial takes within the phrase, a subordinate role, and when not in this structure will be in the adjunct class.

1. Viewpoint
2. Focus
3. Degree

=== Adjuncts vs. complements ===
Adverbials can be adjuncts, complements, conjuncts, or disjuncts. Most commonly, adverbial phrases are either complements or adjuncts. Adjunct adverbial phrases provide additional information and are part of the structure of the clause, but are optional. Complements are elements of an utterance that complete the meaning of the noun or sentence in which it is being used. Unlike adjuncts, they are necessary to complete the meaning of a given sentence. Adverbial complement is the term used to identify an adverbial phrase that is necessary to the meaning of the verb or utterance. Adverbial complements always appear after the verb that they modify. If the verb is intransitive, the complement will appear directly after the verb; if the verb is transitive, the complement will appear after the verb's direct object.

A test to identify whether or not an adverbial phrase is a complement or adjunct is to remove the phrase in question from the sentence. If the sentence no longer makes sense or if its meaning is altered heavily, then the adverbial element is a complement. If the meaning is still intact, it is an adjunct.

Is it an adjunct or a complement?
With adverbial	Without adverbial	Does the sentence become ungrammatical on its own?	
How did you get **home**?	How did you get?	yes	complement
She read the book **quietly**	She read the book	no	adjunct
Put the flowers **in the vase**	Put the flowers	yes	complement
They did their homework **after school**	They did their homework	no	adjunct

== Adverbial fronting ==
One phenomenon occurring frequently in sentences that involve adverbial phrases is adverbial fronting, where the adverbial phrase moves to the front of a sentence.

- I shall go on the cruise next year.
- Next year, I shall go on the cruise.

Work on both this phenomenon, as well as comparing the movement of adverbial phrases to this syntactic position to typical movement and topicalization of arguments has been covered by Haegeman. There is a difference between fronted adjuncts (in this case, adverbial phrases) and topicalized arguments. Adverbial phrases behave as adjuncts, and that serves as particularly useful in discussions regarding adverbial phrases and their movement, as well as their integration into syntactic structure.

== In French vs English ==
Adverbial phrases are different across languages. French is a case in point. Like English, adverbial phrases are the parts of a sentence that add circumstantial information. French often requires using adverbial phrases where English is satisfied with a simple adverb.

For example, where English uses just one adverb, French requires a full adverbial phrase:

- "surprisingly": de manière surprenante
- "forwards": vers l'avant or en avant
- "hopefully": avec un peu d'espoir

Placements of adverbs in adverbial phrases is usually determined by the category of adverbs. In English, placement of adverbs can sometimes be arbitrary, where some adverbs may be found in front or after the verb or even at the beginning of the sentence, while French adverbs have much stricter rules and can be difficult.

When a French adverb modifies a verb, it is placed after the conjugated verb, for example:

Nous avons bien mangé.
"We ate well."

When an adverb modifies an adjective or another adverb, it is placed in front of the word it is modifying, for example:

Je suis profondément ému.
"I am deeply moved."

There is a contrast between verb–adverbial order in French and adverbial–verb order in English. Adverbial expressions are formed in French, by combining prepositions with nouns (or noun phrases), adjectives (adjective + a noun), adverbs, or a series of words.

While movement is slightly different from English, suffixation is similar. Most French words that end in -ment are adverbs, and the majority of the time their English equivalents end in -ly: généralement – "generally". In a brief overview on how adverbs are used in the overall phrase structure, in French there is an expansion in the word due to a derivation adjective adjective-to-adverb conversion process, namely, -ment suffixation. For example:

ferme → fermement
patient → patiemment

Similarly, in English, words have the -ly suffixation added at the end of adverbs in adverbial phrases. For example:

firm → firmly
patient → patiently

However, this process of adding suffixation at the end of the adverbial word in French, is not as productive as -ly suffixation in English, and some adjectives are incompatible with it. For example, the adverb 'interesting' would become ungrammatical if the -ment adverb suffixation were to be added in the word:

intéressant → *intéressamment

Additionally, French adverbials are derived from adjectives in a completely irregular fashion not even using the suffix -ment:

- bon → bien ("good" → "well")
- mauvais → mal ("bad" → "badly")
- meilleur → mieux ("better", adjective → "better", adverb)

== See also ==
- Adjective phrase
- Adverbial
- Adverb
- Adverbial complement
- German adverbial phrases
