= German adverbial phrases =

German adverbial phrases add information to German verbs. An adverb is a word that modifies the meaning of a verb, and an adverbial phrase is a combination of words that perform the same function. The German language includes several different kinds of adverbial phrases.

German, for example, uses adverbial phrases to indicate "change of orientation", such as "nach rechts, nach links, schräg, scharf (‘to the right’, ‘to the left’, ‘diagonally’, ‘sharply’)".

== Native adverbs ==
Many adverbs are not derived from an adjective. Often they have very important meanings. For example, nicht, leider or gerne ("not", "unfortunately", "gladly").

== Accusative nouns with adverbial meaning ==
The duration or the spatial extent of a verb's action can be expressed by a nominal expression in the accusative case.

Das Kind malte die ganze Zeit Bilder ("The child was painting pictures all the time")

== Adverbial forms of adjectives ==
Adverb formation is simpler in German than in most other languages. An adverb is simply the uninflected form of the adjective (or participle). This holds for the positive and comparative forms. The superlative is formed with the preposition am and the ending -en, e.g. am schönsten "most beautifully". Only a limited number of adverbs have a special elative form ending in -stens, e.g. schnellstens ('as fast as possible'), bestens ('very well').

schnell ("fast, quickly")
groß ("big, substantially")
fließend ("fluent, fluently")
schneller ("faster, more quickly")
fließender ("more fluent, more fluently")
am schönsten ("most beautiful, most beautifully")

The adverb can be used to describe actions, adjectives or other adverbs. Comparative and superlative forms are unusual in the last two situations.

Der Vogel fliegt schnell ("the bird flies fast")
Der Vogel fliegt am schnellsten ("the bird flies the fastest")
Ein schrecklich langsam wachsender Baum ("a terribly slow-growing tree") (literally, "a terribly slowly growing tree")
Ein schneller wachsender Baum ("a faster-growing tree")

In English, adverbs are usually distinguished from adjectives by the ending -ly. In German, they may be distinguished by their lack of declension, because adjectives in attributive position must be declined. Compare:

- ein schrecklich hoher Berg – an awfully high mountain.
- ein schrecklicher, hoher Berg - an awful, high mountain.

== Adverbs ending in -erweise ==
Unlike English, the German language distinguishes adverbs which qualify verbs or adjectives from those which qualify whole sentences. For the latter case, many German adjectives form a special adverb form ending in -erweise, e.g. glücklicherweise "luckily", traurigerweise "sadly" (from Weise = way, manner).

This structure might be cognate with the English -wise, an "adverb combining form," e.g., "clockwise".

In the following two example sentences, the adverb lustig "funnily" qualifies the verb, while lustigerweise "funnily" qualifies the whole sentence:

- Er hat lustig gesungen. – He sang funnily. (= He sang in a way that was funny.)
- Er hat lustigerweise gesungen. – Funnily, he sang. (= It was funny that he sang.)

As in the above example, English usually expresses the difference by placing the adverb which qualifies a sentence, in the beginning. In German, it can be placed in the beginning or elsewhere in the sentence.

== Prepositional phrases ==
A prepositional phrase consists of a nominal phrase and an adposition (a preposition, postposition, or circumposition). The case of the nominal phrase can be accusative or dative. Some prepositions always take the accusative case and some always take the dative case. Students usually memorize these because the difference may not be intuitive. A third group of prepositions, called two way prepositions, take either the accusative case or the dative case depending on the phrase's exact meaning. If the statement describes movement across a boundary then the phrase is accusative. Other situations, including movement within a confined area, take the dative case. For example:

Ich schlafe im Haus. (dative case) ("I sleep inside the house.") ["im" is a contraction of in & dem]
Ich laufe ins Haus. (accusative case) ("I run into the house.") ["ins" is a contraction of in & das]
Ich laufe im Haus. (dative case) ("I run within the house.")

Prepositions do not always have a locative meaning; they can also be modal or temporal adverbs, for example.

Prepositional phrases, being adverbial, may be used to describe actions and adjectives. They can also be attributes of a nominal phrase.

Ich gehe ins Haus ("I go into the house")
(Eis ist) während der Sommerzeit begehrt ("ice-cream is much sought-after in the summertime")

In some cases, the preposition and the article of the nominal phrase may or must elide together. This is similar to Italian.

NOT von dem Himmel BUT vom Himmel

=== Pronominal adverbs ===
A real position can be substituted by a pronominal adverb.

auf dem Tisch - darauf ("on the table - on there")
auf den Berg hinauf - dort hinauf ("up the mountain - up there")
während der Schulstunde - währenddessen ("during the lesson - during it")
der Gerechtigkeit wegen - deswegen ("because of justice - because of it / therefore / hence")
mit dem Flugzeug - damit ("by plane - by it")

Pronominal adverbs may be preceded by an adverbial clause. See below.

=== Adverbial clauses ===
Besides prepositional phrases and pronominal adverbs, there are also adverbial clauses. They can be applied to actions as well as to nominal phrases and pronominal adverbs.

Ich ging nach Hause, während die Sonne unterging ("I went home as the sun was setting")
damals - damals, als/während Helmut Kohl Bundeskanzler war ("in those days, when/while Helmut Kohl was chancellor")
in jenem Jahr - in jenem Jahr, als/während Helmut Kohl Bundeskanzler war ("in that year, when/while Helmut Kohl was chancellor")

Such a sentence can also completely replace a position or pronominal adverb. ("The previous sentence needs to be clarified by someone knowledgeable")

als Willy Brandt Bundeskanzler war INSTEAD OF damals, als Willy Brandt Bundeskanzler war ("when Willy Brandt was chancellor / in those days when Willy Brandt was chancellor")
wo die Sonne scheint INSTEAD OF am Himmel, wo die Sonne scheint ("where the sun shines / in the sky, where the sun shines")
