= Flat adverb =

Adverb that is the same as its adjective form

In English grammar, a flat adverb, bare adverb, or simple adverb is an adverb that has the same form as the corresponding adjective, so it usually does not end in -ly, e.g. "drive slow", "drive safe", "dress smart", etc. The term includes words that naturally end in -ly in both forms, e.g. "drive friendly". Flat adverbs were once quite common but have been largely replaced by their -ly counterparts, with comparative (e.g., "run quicker") and superlative forms (e.g., "run quickest") converted to periphrasis (e.g., "run more quickly" and "run most quickly"). In the 18th century, grammarians believed flat adverbs to be adjectives, and insisted that adverbs needed to end in -ly. According to the Merriam-Webster Dictionary, "It's these grammarians we have to thank for ... the sad lack of flat adverbs today". There are now only a few flat adverbs, and some are widely thought of as incorrect. Despite bare adverbs being grammatically correct and widely used by respected authors, they are often stigmatized. There have even been public campaigns against street signs with the traditional text "go slow" and the innovative text "drive friendly."

== Bare adverbs that alternate with -ly forms ==
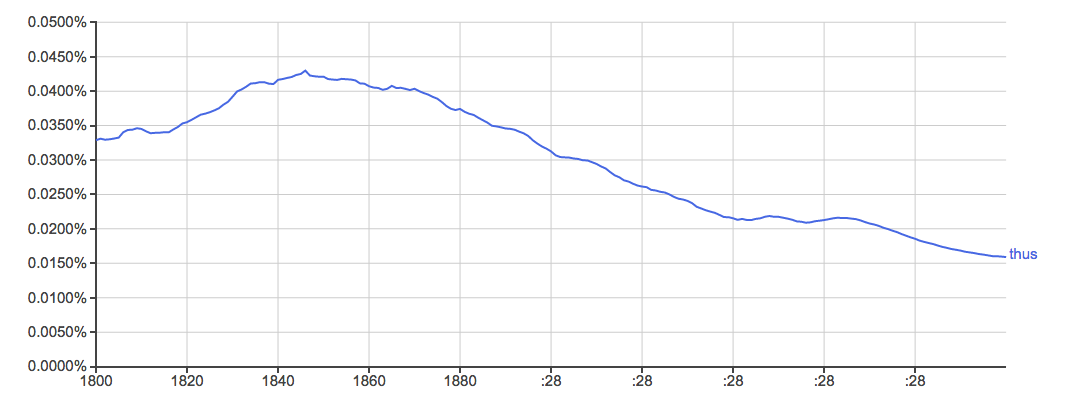
Proportional use of the word thus has slowly declined since the 1800s.

For most bare adverbs, an alternative form exists ending in -ly (slowly). Sometimes the -ly form has a different meaning (hardly, nearly, cleanly, rightly, closely, lowly, shortly), and sometimes the -ly form is not used for certain meanings (sit tight, sleep tight).

The adverb seldom is a curious example. It dates back to Anglo-Saxon times, but starting in the 1960s the same word began appearing in English books as seldomly. It has been hypothesized that the decline in usage of seldom in English, combined with the 18th century insistence on adverbs ending in -ly, resulted in its occasionally used -ly form.

Similarly, usage of the word "thus" has fallen since 1800, while usage of an -ly form, thusly, has spiked recently.

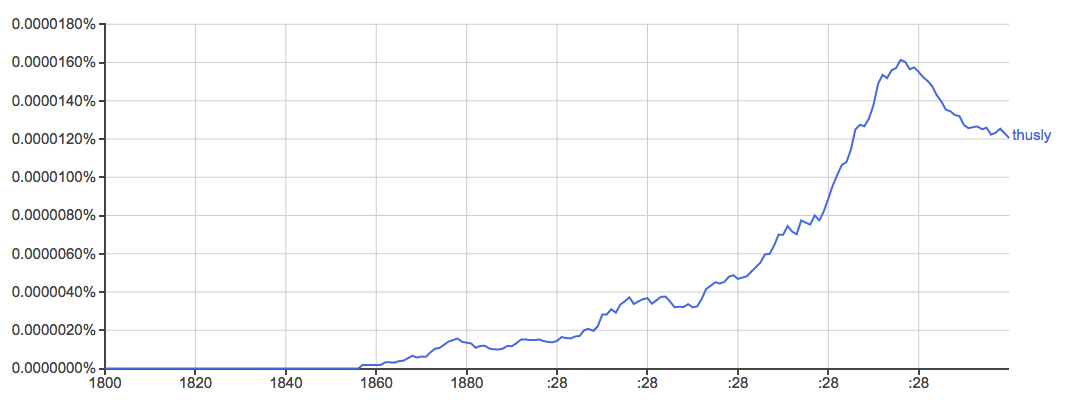
The proportional use of the word thusly grew over time. There is a difference of scale with the previous graph. Despite the trend, the source still lists thus as roughly 10,000 times as frequent as thusly in 2000.

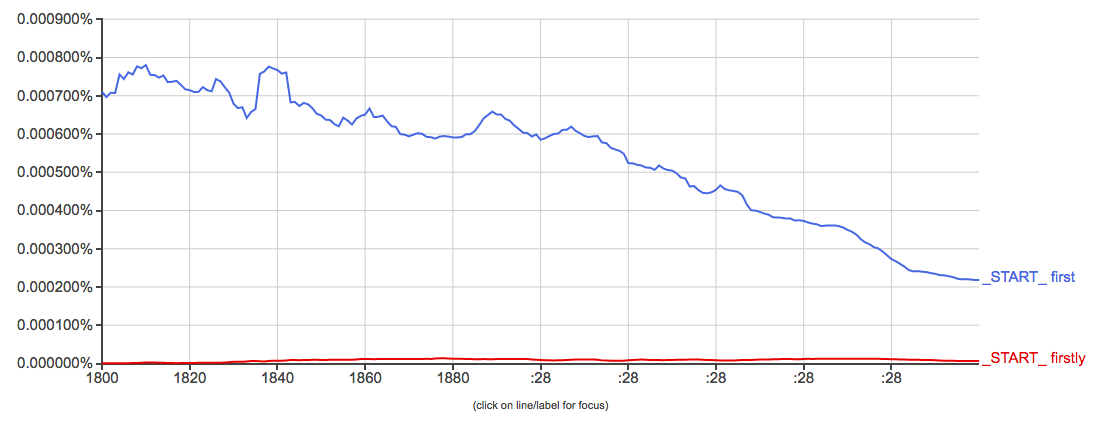
Proportional usage of first and firstly at the beginning of a sentence since 1800. Position at the beginning means they are likely both sentential adverbs.

Numerical adjectives (first, second, last) rarely are used in an -ly form despite having a valid alternative. While words like firstly and lastly exist, their flat form is much more commonly used. Here, in contrast to other flat adverbs such as good ("they cook good"), the flat form is universally accepted in English as proper speech.

== Bare adverbs that do not alternate ==
Some bare adverbs do not alternate, e.g., fast, straight, tough, far, low. In addition, the ending -ly is also found on some words that are both adverbs and adjectives (e.g. friendly) and some words that are only adjectives (e.g. lonely).

Nearly all irregular comparative adjectives in English can take on adverbial form and never use the -ly. Some examples are good, bad, little, much, and far – and their comparative forms (e.g. better and best).

My best number was the one I'd practiced least.

Which one hurt more?

Steel and coal companies were the ones worst affected by tariffs.

=== Analyses of bare adverbs ===
Flat adverbs work as intensifiers that modify specific words, compound expressions or phrases. Consider sentences containing real and really:

I really like the pie. I real like the pie. (ungrammatical)

Here, real becomes really to become an adverb to the verb like, while real cannot do the same and remain flat. According to data from the Corpus of Contemporary American English, real was followed by a verb only 657 times. For comparison, real was followed by an adjective 12,813 times, with good being the most common adjective collocated (1,584 times). In this case, real can only modify adjectives.

This pie tastes really good.

This pie tastes real good. (informal)

This pie really tastes good. (meaning is changed)

This pie real tastes good. (ungrammatical)

Alternatively, the flat adverb sure can only modify verbs. Citing data from the Corpus of Contemporary American English, sure was followed by a verb 7,396 times, but it was rarely followed by an adjective at only 470 times. Compare:

We sure had a great time.

We surely had a great time.

We had a sure great time. (ungrammatical)

We had a surely great time. (meaning is changed) (probably ungrammatical)

This can possibly be explained by the differing uses of the suffix -ly, and another adverbial suffix, -e. According to the Oxford English Dictionary, there are two different uses of the suffix -ly: when the suffix transforms a word into an adjective (e.g. brotherly), and when it forms an adverb. The suffix's origins are in Old English, coming from -lice, which is related to the German -lich. Due to its use in history, many verbs and adverbs have been formed from roots that are harder to recognize today (compare: verily as very+ly, only as one+ly, especially as especial+ly). Before -ly, -e was the most common adverbial suffix in Old English. The suffixes were not competing and could even be used interchangeably (rhyte – rhytlice are both 'rightly'). Examinations of texts from the time period show that the -e form was more common in poetry, while the -lice form was more common in prose.

As English developed as a language, it began weakening its vowels, and as such the -e suffix gradually disappeared, making the adverbs bare. Some words retained adverbial use without the -e, such as long, fast, or hard. The adverbs had dwindled in number but did not die out entirely.

At this point in Old English, the adverbial system was still not as developed as it would become in later stages. Sentential adverbs were beginning to be developed and adverbs became used in more specific ways, and the vowel weakening -e in tandem with more easily expressed -ly forms caused -ly to become the dominant adverbial form. Although there were no categorical changes between flat adverbs and the new adverbs, their use was generally limited. More and more adverbs took on this form for greater homogeneity among the class. John Earle wrote that a flat adverb was "simply a substantive or an adjective placed in the adverbial position." However, he found that flat adverbs are not suitable for many of the advanced uses that a modern adverb might be. An example of a more advanced adverb would be the sentential naturally, as in naturally, we got along.

== Acceptability over time ==
The term 'flat adverb' was coined in 1871 by John Earle, and even in that time they were viewed as "rustic and poetic" because they were "archaic". Flat adverbs were relatively common in English through the 18th century, although more so in the United States. Earle writes that the flat adverb was "all but universal with the illiterate". One recorded example of their use is in letters by author Jane Austen. She used near, exceeding, and terrible as flat adverbs in one letter – and usage such as this was common in spoken discourse.

Although grammarians stigmatized them, flat adverbs are found to be accepted by English speakers, and their usage has grown over the past century. A survey carried out in the 1960s studied people's attitudes towards usage problems in English. The examples "you'd better go slow" (rather than slowly) and "he did it quicker than he'd ever done it before" (rather than more quickly) contained flat adverbs – and the latter was found to be acceptable by just 42% of respondents. However, in a follow-up in the 2010s by the Leiden University Centre for Linguistics, using the same examples from the 1960s survey and others containing flat adverbs, they found that acceptance of flat adverbs has become much more widespread in recent years. Quicker was found to have an acceptance rate of 75%, while "you'd better go slow" was universally accepted.
