= Adverbial =

Word or group of words that modify a verb

In English grammar, an adverbial (abbreviated adv) is a word (an adverb) or a group of words (an adverbial clause or adverbial phrase) that modifies or more closely defines the sentence or the verb. (The word adverbial itself is also used as an adjective, meaning "having the same function as an adverb".) Look at the examples below:

Danny speaks fluently. (telling more about the verb)
Lorna ate breakfast yesterday morning. (telling when the verb's action occurred)

== The form of adverbials ==
Adverbials most commonly take the form of adverbs, adverb phrases, temporal noun phrases or prepositional phrases. Many types of adverbials (for instance: reason and condition) are often expressed by clauses.

James answered immediately. (adverb)
James answered in English. (prepositional phrase)
James answered this morning. (noun phrase)
James answered in English because he had a foreign visitor. (adverbial clause)

An adverbial is a construction which modifies or describes verbs. When an adverbial modifies a verb, it changes the meaning of that verb. This may be performed by an adverb or a word group, either considered an adverbial: for example, a prepositional phrase, a noun phrase, a finite clause or a non-finite clause.

== Types of adverbials that form sentence elements ==
Adverbials are typically divided into four classes:

Adverbial complements (i.e. obligatory adverbials) are adverbials that render a sentence ungrammatical and meaningless if removed.

John put the flowers in the water.

Adjuncts: These are part of the core meaning of the sentence, but if omitted still leave a meaningful sentence.

John and Sophia helped me with my homework.

Conjuncts: These link two sentences together.

John helped; therefore, I was able to do my homework.

Disjuncts: These make comments on the meaning of the rest of the sentence.

Surprisingly, he passed all of his exams.

== Distinguishing an adverbial from an adjunct ==
All verb- or sentence-modifying adjuncts are adverbials, but some adverbials are not adjuncts.

- If the removal of an adverbial does not leave a well-formed sentence, then it is not an adjunct
- If the adverbial modifies within a sentence element, and is not a sentence element in its own right, it is not an adjunct.
- If the adverbial is not grammatically tied to the sentence it is not an adjunct, e.g.

Mr Reninson, however, voted against the proposal. (adverbial conjunct not adjunct)

== Other types of adverbials ==
=== Directional and locative particles ===
Prepositions (in, out, etc.) may be used adverbially to indicate direction or location.

- Superman flew in. (directional)
- Are you in? (locative)
- The car drove out. (directional)
- The ball is out. (locative)

=== Negators ===
In some grammar models, negators such as "not" and "never" are considered adverbs with the function of negating adverbial clauses.

=== Expletives ===
Often ignored, expletives may take up many adverbial syntactic functions. Pragmatically and semantically, they often serve as intensifiers, boosting the content of the clause they appear in.

- What the hell are you talking about?
- You're freaking lying!
- You bloody well know that smoking's not allowed here!
- He got sodding killed.

== See also ==
- Adverbial case
