= Subjunctive by attraction =

In Latin grammar, the subjunctive by attraction is the situation when the verb in a relative clause or a temporal clause that is closely dependent on a subjunctive verb becomes subjunctive itself. The name also applies to subjunctives used when a subordinate clause is "so closely connected with an infinitive as to form an integral part of" it.

== Examples of subjunctive by attraction ==
The following sentences are cited in grammars of a verb in a subordinate clause which is made subjunctive because the main verb is subjunctive. In the first group, the affected verb is in a relative clause of a general type:

- quis eum dīligat quem metuat? (Cicero)

'who would love a man that he fears?'

- quod emās possīs iūre vocāre tuum (Martial)

'that which you buy, you could rightly call your own'

- nec eōrum quisquam adhūc inventus est cui quod habēret esset satis (Cicero)

'no (miser) has ever yet been found for whom what he had was enough'

- ab aliō exspectēs alterī quod fēcerīs (Publilius Syrus)

'whatever you have done to another, you should expect from a third person'

In the second group, the affected verb is in a generalised temporal clause ('whenever...') or conditional clause ('if ever...'):

- quārē fīēbat ut omnium oculōs, quotiēnscumque in pūblicum prōdīsset, ad sē converteret (Nepos)

'thus it used to happen that whenever he went out in public, he made everyone's eyes turn to him'

- (arāneolae) rēte texunt ut sī quid inhaeserit cōnficiant (Cicero)

'spiders weave a web so that, if anything gets caught in it, they can finish it off'

In the following case, both verbs depend on an initial verb of fearing:

- sed vereor nē, dum minuere velim labōrem, augeam (Cicero)

'but I am afraid in case, while I am trying to lessen the difficulty, I might end up by increasing it'

In another group cited by grammars, the subordinate clause with a subjunctive verb depends on an infinitive:

- est ōrātõris, quaecumque rēs īnfīnītē posita sit, dē eā posse dīcere (Cicero)

'an orator must be capable of speaking about any general subject that is put before him'

- pigrī est ingeniī contentum esse iīs quae sint ab aliīs inventa (Quintilian)

'it is a sign of a lazy nature to be content with things which have been discovered by other people'

- mōs est Athēnīs laudārī in cōntiōne eōs quī sint in proeliīs interfectī (Cicero)

'it is a custom at Athens for those who have died in battles to be praised in the assembly'

- neque bonitās esse potest, sī nōn per sē expetātur (Cicero)

'nor can goodness exist if it is not sought for its own sake'

However, the relative clauses in the first and second examples could also be seen as generic ('the sort of things which...').

A verb in a relative clause dependent on a subjunctive does not always become subjunctive. In the following examples, the underlined verbs are indicative, even though the writer is talking in general terms, not about a particular case:

- quod vidēs perīsse, perditum ducās (Catullus)

'the thing which you see has perished, you should consider lost for ever'

- efficitur ab ōrātōre ut iī quī audiunt ita adficiantur ut ōrātor velit (Cicero)

'it is brought about by an orator that those who hear are affected as he wishes'

The subjunctive is even less likely to be used when the relative clause is referring to a particular group of individuals:

- equitēs mīsit ut eōs quī fugerant persequerētur (Caesar)

'he sent cavalrymen to pursue those who had fled'

According to Gildersleeve & Lodge (1895), the subjunctive by attraction has something in common with the subjunctive which is obligatory in dependent clauses in indirect speech, such as the following:

- (Catō) mīrārī sē aiēbat quod nōn rīdēret haruspex haruspicem cum vīdisset (Cicero)

'Cato used to say that he was surprised that one soothsayer didn't laugh whenever he saw another'

- rēctē Graecī praecipiunt, nōn temptanda quae efficī nōn possint (Quintilian)

'the Greeks rightly teach that things which can't be accomplished shouldn't be attempted'

== Accounting for the subjunctive by attraction ==
One authority, Hale, explains the usage as follows:

In complex sentences made up of a main sentence with subjunctive verb and one or more subordinate sentences, the modal feeling in the speaker's mind which expresses itself in the main sentence is, in the nature of things, very likely to continue in the speaker's mind in the subordinated sentence or sentences, either quite unchanged or but slightly shaded. If, for example, I say in Latin, 'Let him send whom he will,' mittat quem velit, the mood in velit is not a case of 'attraction' or 'assimilation' at all. Velit is as much a jussive as mittat is. The meaning is, 'Let him choose his man and send that man.' Again, the frequent recurrence of such examples gives rise to the occasional use of a dependent subjunctive with only a formal likeness to the main subjunctive, and no true modal feeling.

Bennett (1910) contests this reasoning:

I am unable to admit the soundness of this reasoning. To my mind Hale seems to do great violence to the interpretation of the passage above cited. ... I do not believe it legitimate to read into velit the jussive force which Hale attributes to it. Much less can I admit the justice of Frank's statement that Hale's interpretation of the mood of velit is beyond dispute. ... I am, therefore, inclined to believe that in the phenomenon under consideration we are to recognize a purely formal and mechanical attraction.

== Conditions under which attraction takes place ==
Frank's study (1904) shows:

1. The attracted clause is preferably in the same time-sphere as the clause on which it depends.
2. Its favorite position is between the introductory conjunction (when such exists) and the verb of the governing clause.
3. Its verb rarely expresses precise modal and temporal force.
4. The clause as a whole is rather of the generalizing than of the determinative type.
5. It is more frequently a temporal than a relative clause.
6. It is connected with the predicate more frequently than with the subject or object of the sentence.
7. As a rule, it is an essential clause, and grammatically depends very closely upon the main body of the clause to which it is attracted.

These favoring conditions are met in only about 37% of all the clauses dependent upon subjunctives. When these favoring conditions do not exist, the dependent clause stands in the indicative, unless the clause would regularly stand in the subjunctive for some other reason (purpose, result, etc.).
