= Adverbial complement =

Adverbials (grammar) required to complete the meaning of a verb or sentence

An adverbial complement is an adverbial that is required to complete the meaning of a verb, such that if it is removed, it will yield an ungrammatical sentence or an intrinsically different meaning of the verb. They stand in contrast to adverbial adjuncts, which can be removed from a sentence without altering its structure or meaning.

Adverbial complements often accompany verbs of caused motion such as put or place:

- She put the cheese back.
- *She put the cheese.
- Now place the vase on the mantlepiece.
- *Now place the vase.

However, they can occur with other types of verbs as well:

- We are staying in a hotel.
- *We are staying.

== Theoretical approaches ==
Head-driven phrase structure grammar describes adverbial complements as part of the verbs' subcategorization frame, which is why they are obligatory arguments. In this theory, adverbial complements are stored in the lexicon as part of the grammatical competence relating to the verb.

An alternative description, along the lines of construction grammar is that they are parts of certain argument structure constructions – in this case the caused motion construction – which are specifically compatible with the semantics of the verb. Here, adverbial complements are stored in the grammar as part of the caused motion construction which is a sign in its own right.

Another construction-based theory combines the two arguing that certain senses of verbs co-occur so frequently with certain argument structure constructions, that the argument structures are also stored as part of the grammatical competence relating to the verb. These small argument structure constructions are called mini-constructions. So, in the case of put, in accordance with this theory, adverbial complements are both part of the argument structure construction and stored as information regarding the verb itself.

== See also ==
- Adjunct
- Conjunct
- Disjunct
- English grammar
