= Adverbial clause =

English language grammar

An adverbial clause is a dependent clause that functions as an adverb. That is, the entire clause modifies a separate element within a sentence or the sentence itself. As with all clauses, it contains a subject and predicate, though the subject as well as the (predicate) verb are omitted and implied if the clause is reduced to an adverbial phrase as discussed below.

== Adverbial clause versus adverbial phrase ==
=== Adverbial clauses ===
An adverbial clause begins with a subordinating conjunction—sometimes called a trigger word. In the examples below, the adverbial clause is italicized and the subordinating conjunction is bolded:

Mary, the aspiring actress, became upset as soon as she saw the casting list.

(subject: she; predicate: saw the casting list; the clause modifies the verb became)

Peter, the drama teacher, met with Mary after she calmed down.

(explicit subject: she; predicate: calmed down; predicate (verb): calmed; the clause modifies the verb met)

We left before the speeches ended.

(adverbial clause; contains subject and predicate)

According to Sidney Greenbaum and Randolph Quirk (Greenbaum and Quirk, 1990), adverbial clauses function mainly as adverbial adjuncts or disjuncts but differ in syntax from adverbial phrases and adverbial prepositional phrases, as indicated below.

=== Adverbial phrases ===
Unlike adverbial clauses, adverbial phrases contain neither an explicit subject nor a predicate. In the examples below, the adverbial phrase is italicized and the adposition is bolded:

Mary, the aspiring actress, became upset as one of the casting list rejects.
Peter, the drama teacher, met with Mary after seeing her disappointment.
We left before the speeches.

== Types ==
Adverbial clauses are divided into several groups according to the actions or senses of their conjunctions:

Type of clause	Common conjunctions	Function	Example
Adverb clause of time	Conjunctions answering the question "when?", such as: when, before, after, since, while, as, as long as, till, until, etc.; or the paired (correlative) conjunctions: hardly...when, scarcely...when, barely...when, no sooner...than	These clauses: Say when something happens by referring to a period or point of time, or to another event.	Her goldfish died when she was young. He came after night had fallen. We barely had gotten there when mighty Casey struck out. He told us his adventures in Arctic as we went along.
Adverb clause of condition	if, unless, lest, provided that	Talk about a possible or counterfactual situation and its consequences.	If they lose weight during an illness, they soon regain it afterwards.
Adverb clause of purpose	in order to, so that, in order that, in case	Indicate the purpose of an action.	They had to take some of his land so that they could extend the churchyard.
Adverb clause of reason	because, since, as, given	Indicate the reason for something.	I couldn't feel anger against him because I liked him too much.
Adverb clause of concession (contrast)	although, though, while	Make two statements, one of which contrasts with the other or makes it seem surprising.	I used to read a lot, though I don't have much time for books now.
Adverb clause of place	Answering the question "where?": where, wherever, anywhere, everywhere, etc.	Talk about the location or position of something.	He said he was happy where he was.
Adverb clause of comparison	as...as, than, as	State comparison of a skill, size or amount, etc.	Johan can speak English as fluently as his teacher can. She is a better cook than I am.
Adverb clause of manner	Answering the question, "how"?: as, like	Talk about someone's behavior or the way something is done.	I was never allowed to do things as I wanted to do. He spent a lot of money as if he was very rich.
Adverb clause of results	so...that, such...that	Indicate the result(s) of an act or event.	My suitcase had become so damaged that the lid would not stay closed.
Adverb of frequency	by and by, always, usually, sometimes, often	Indicates how often an action happens	He is often late for work.

== See also ==
- Temporal clause (Latin)
