= Prepositional adverb =

Word which is similar in form to a preposition but acts as an adverb

A prepositional adverb is a word – mainly a particle – which is very similar in its form to a preposition but functions as an adverb. Prepositional adverbs occur, for example, in English, German and Dutch. Unlike real prepositions, they occur mainly at the end of a phrase and not before nouns. They also modify the verb, which a preposition does not.

An example of a prepositional adverb in English is inside in He peeked inside.

== Phrasal verb ==
A verb combined with a prepositional adverb is called a phrasal verb only if the verb's meaning is changed by the prepositional adverb. In English, there are many examples of this. For example, let can have many possible meanings depending on which prepositional adverb it is combined with (let down, let in, let off, let to, etc.)

== Prepositional adverbs in other languages ==
Although prepositional adverbs are largely associated with Germanic languages, those of other classes occasionally have corresponding features. For instance, Slavic languages such as Czech may prefix prepositions to verbs of motion (jít to go → dojít to come towards, odejít to go away from). In Hungarian, the case endings may also be prefixed to verbs (városba to the city, bemenni to go towards), much as in German.

== See also ==
- Pronominal adverb
- Preposition and postposition
- Prepositional pronoun
- Phrasal verb
