= Latin temporal clause =

Latin adverbial clause of time

A temporal clause is an adverbial clause of time, that is to say, a clause which informs the reader about the time when the action of main verb of the sentence occurred. So in a sentence such as "after I had said this, he went out", the first clause is a temporal clause. The name comes from the Latin word tempus, genitive temporis, 'time".

Typically in Latin a temporal clause has a conjunction of time such as cum "when" or postquam "after" at or near the beginning of the clause and a verb at the end. The verb in a Latin temporal clause is usually in the indicative mood, although sometimes, especially when the conjunction is cum, it is in the subjunctive. But if the clause is part of indirect speech, the verb is nearly always in the subjunctive mood.

The conjunctions used to introduce temporal clauses sometimes have other, non-temporal, meanings. For example, cum can mean "when", "since", or "although"; dum can mean "while", "until", or "provided that"; ubi can mean "when" or "where", and so on.

Another possibility commonly used in Latin for expressing time is a participial phrase. For example, the temporal clauses id postquam audīvit (Nepos) "after he heard this" and quod cum audīvisset (Cicero) "when he heard this" both mean much the same thing as the participial phrase quō audītō (Pliny) (literally, "with which heard").

Temporal clauses are very frequent in certain styles of Latin such as history, and it is not uncommon to find a sentence introduced by two or three temporal clauses, often mixed with participial phrases of time.

== Classification of temporal clauses ==
A common way of classifying temporal clauses is according to whether the action or situation described in the temporal clause is antecedent, contemporaneous, or subsequent to that of the main verb:

A. The action of the temporal clause verb is antecedent to that of the main verb:

- The temporal clause describes an event completed before the main verb:

e.g. "after the signal was given, they began fighting"

- The temporal clause describes a situation which began before the main verb and which may overlap with it:

e.g. "once the soldiers were in position, the generals came forward"

B. The action of the temporal clause verb is contemporaneous with the main verb:

- Two events co-occur:

e.g. "when he fell, he was hurt"

- Two situations are co-extensive:

e.g. "he was happy as long as he lived"

- The main clause event occurs during the temporal clause situation:

e.g. "they arrived while he was sleeping"

- The temporal clause event occurs during the main clause situation:

e.g. "when they arrived he was sleeping"

- The main clause situation is interrupted by a temporal clause event

e.g. "he was sleeping, when suddenly they arrived"

- The temporal clause defines the start-point of a situation:

e.g. "he had lived there since he was born"

- The temporal clause defines the end-point of a situation:

e.g. "he lived there until he died"

C. The action of the temporal clause is subsequent to that of the main verb:

- The temporal clause event happened:

e.g. "he left before I arrived"

- The temporal clause event did not happen:

e.g. "he left before I had a chance to speak"

A second way of classifying temporal clauses is whether the sentence refers to a definite time, as in the above examples, or is iterative, describing a generalisation or repeated action at an indefinite time:

e.g. "whenever they win, they make a sacrifice"

A third classification is whether the main verb and hence the sentence as a whole is situated in past, present, or future time.

A fourth method of classification, followed in this article, is according to the different conjunctions used.

== Choice of conjunction ==
Roman authors differ from one another in style, and this is shown among other things by their preference for different conjunctions. The table below shows the number of temporal clauses for some of the most common conjunctions in three historians of the republican period, Julius Caesar, Cornelius Nepos, and Sallust, and two poets of the following generation, Virgil and Ovid. The conjunctions are cum "when, while", postquam "after", ubi "when", ut "as, as soon as, when", simulatque "as soon as". The figures for posteāquam and simulac are included with postquam and simulatque.

Author	cum (indic.)	cum (subj.)	postquam	ubi	ut	simulatque
Caesar	10	147	22	55	5	6
Nepos	13	181	45	4	26	4
Sallust	22	24	90	119	0	0
Virgil	51	11	19	30	22	1
Ovid	35	13	30	25	36	13

The figures for cum here are for clauses of time only, omitting causal or concessive ones.

The table shows that the narrative cum with the subjunctive is very common in Caesar and Nepos, but little used by the other three authors. Sallust used ubi more than any other of the conjunctions, but it was avoided by Nepos. Conversely, Nepos and the two poets make frequent use of ut, but it is never used by Sallust. Caesar made relatively little use of postquam compared with the other authors.

The following table shows the relative use of postquam and posteāquam "after" and antequam and priusquam "before":

Author	postquam	posteāquam	antequam	priusquam
Cicero	57	187	203	90
Caesar	13	9	2	17
Nepos	35	9	0	32
Sallust	89	2	1	14
Livy	428	4	97	308

From this table it can be seen that Cicero had a clear preference for posteāquam, while the other authors preferred postquam. The conjunction antequam is more common than priusquam in Cicero, and was used to an extent by Livy, but is almost completely avoided by Caesar, Nepos, and Sallust.

The conjunctions quoad and dōnec, both meaning "until" or "as long as", also show variation. Quoad occurs 144 times in Cicero but only twice in Tacitus. It is rare in poetry, occurring once in Horace and twice in Lucretius only. Conversely, dōnec is hardly found at all in writers of the republican period, but became popular under the empire; in Tacitus it occurs 140 times.

Author	quoad	dōnec
Cicero	144	3
Caesar	7	0
Sallust	2	0
Nepos	11	0
Livy 1–10	4	54
Tacitus	2	140

== Tense and mood ==
The tense and mood of the verb used in a temporal clause can affect the meaning. For example, cum vēnisset (pluperfect subjunctive) means "after he came", but cum vēnerat (pluperfect indicative) means "whenever he came". Or again, dum venit (present indicative) means "while he was coming", but dum venīret (imperfect subjunctive) means "until he came".

The tense and mood used in a temporal clause may also vary with the conjunction: postquam audīvit ("after he heard") uses the perfect indicative, but cum audīvisset ("when he had heard") uses the pluperfect subjunctive, although the meaning is very similar or identical. In a past context, the conjunctions postquam, ubi, ut, and simulatque tend to use the perfect or imperfect indicative, whereas cum is usually followed by the imperfect or pluperfect subjunctive.

Over the three centuries between 200 BC and 100 AD, the use of the subjunctive in temporal clauses became more common. The conjunction cum mostly has the indicative in Plautus, but in Caesar the majority of cum clauses have the subjunctive. Iterative clauses (that is, those meaning "whenever...") usually have the indicative in Caesar and Cicero, but from Livy onwards the subjunctive became usual. A similar increased use of the subjunctive can be seen in clauses containing dum "while / until" and priusquam "before".

On the whole, temporal clauses use the indicative mood unless they are in indirect speech. The main exceptions are the common use of cum with the imperfect or pluperfect subjunctive, and clauses of the type "before X could happen" or "until such time as X might happen" which anticipate some future event.

One difference from English grammar is that in temporal clauses referring to the future (e.g. "when you receive this, write back"), the future or future perfect tense is usually used in Latin where English uses the present. Thus the Latin equivalent is "when you will have received this, write back". In such sentences, if the main verb is an imperative, the future imperative (e.g. scrībitō "write (at that time)") is used. The same tenses are used with conditional sentences starting with sī "if":

- ubi nihil erit quod scrībās, id ipsum scrībitō (Cicero)

"when there is (lit. "will be") nothing to write about, write that fact itself"

- sī quid acciderit ... scrībitō (Cicero)

"if anything happens (lit. "will have happened"), write"

== Word order ==
A temporal clause can come before the main clause, after it, or in the middle. It is also possible, in the case of separated prius ... quam, for the main verb to be placed in the middle of the conjunction. In the majority of cases, however, temporal clauses precede the clauses which they modify. This is because the main information which the speaker wishes to communicate, or "focus" of the sentence, tends to be placed second. But if the main information is in the temporal clause (as with cum inversum clauses), they come after the main clause.

Quite frequently a topic word precedes the temporal clause conjunction. The topic word sometimes comes from the temporal clause itself, for example eō and id in the following sentences:

eō cum veniō, praetor quiēscēbat (Cicero)
"when I got there, the governor was taking a siesta"

id ubi vident, mutant consilium (Caesar)
"when they saw this, they changed their plan"

In other sentences the topic word comes from the main clause, such as Balbum in the example below:

Balbum, posteāquam tū es profectus, nōn vīdī (Cicero)
"As for Balbus, I haven't seen him since you left"

Sometimes several topic words can precede the temporal clause, as in the following:

ibī eum Caesar cum vīdisset, nihil asperē, nihil acerbē dīxit (Cicero)
"when Caesar saw him there, he didn't say anything harsh or unkind"

The verb in the temporal clause usually comes at the end of the clause, although as the examples below show, there are occasional exceptions.

== Different conjunctions ==
=== cum ===
The most commonly used conjunction in temporal clauses is cum; an older spelling was quom, showing its derivation from the relative pronoun quī. The usual meaning is "when", but it can also mean "since/in view of the fact that" or "although/despite the fact that" (concessive cum). These meanings can overlap to an extent.

Grammarians usually divide the meanings into two classes: the purely temporal cum, which takes an indicative mood verb, and the circumstantial cum, which takes the subjunctive mood. The circumstantial is divided into historical, causal, and concessive uses.

In the early Latin of Plautus, both types of cum were followed by the indicative mood; however, in the classical period, whenever the meaning is causal or concessive, cum is always followed by the subjunctive mood. When the meaning is purely of time, in a present or future context, the indicative is usual; in a past context, in the classical period, both subjunctive and indicative are used, but the subjunctive is much more common.

When cum has the subjunctive mood, it usually expresses a fact of secondary importance. In such clauses 'the mind of the writer seems always fixed on something farther on, which is of more importance to him". This is known as "circumstantial cum".

==== Historic cum ====
One of the most common uses of cum, often found in historical writing, is with the imperfect or pluperfect subjunctive, giving the circumstances in which an action took place. This is known as the "historic" or "narrative" use of cum.

When the tense is imperfect subjunctive, it usually describes a situation already happening when the main action took place. A common way of translating it is "while":

cum sedērem domī trīstis, accurrit Venerius (Cicero)
"while I was sitting sadly at home, Venerius suddenly came running up"

cum iam adpropinquāret urbī, omnis sēsē multitūdō ad cognōscendum effūdit (Caesar)
"while the ship was approaching the city, the whole population poured out to find out the news"

cum iter faceret forte sōlus, quercum vīdit proximē viam (Gellius)
"when by chance he was making a journey alone, he saw an oak-tree near the road"

With the pluperfect subjunctive, it usually means "after X had happened":

cum excessisset Aegyptō Antiochus, lēgātī ... Cyprum nāvigant (Livy)
"after Antiochus had left Egypt, the ambassadors sailed to Cyprus"

hoc cum vōce magnā dīxisset, sē ex nāvī prōiēcit (Caesar)
"after he had said this in a loud voice, he flung himself out of the ship"

haec cum Crassus dīxisset, silentium est cōnsecūtum (Cicero)
"after Crassus had said these words, a silence followed"

==== Imperfect indicative in the main clause ====
Normally the verb in the main clause after a historic cum-clause will be either historic present or perfect indicative. However, sometimes the main verb is in the imperfect tense, in which case it describes a situation rather than an event. In the following sentences, the main verb does not describe a pre-existing situation, but a situation which began after the action of the temporal clause:

eō cum vēnisset, magnā difficultāte adficiēbātur, quā ratiōne ad exercitum pervenīre posset (Caesar)
"after he arrived there, he was in great difficulty as to how he could reach the army"

Caesar, cum in Asiam vēnisset, reperiēbat T. Ampium cōnātum esse pecūnias tollere Ephesō ex fānō Diānae (Caesar)
"after Caesar arrived in Asia, he began hearing reports that Titus Ampius had been trying to steal money from the temple of Diana in Ephesus"

The following sentence, however, is ambiguous. Some translators interpret it to mean that the situation had already begun when Caesar arrived:

eō cum vēnisset, cohortēs quīnque praemissae ā Domitiō ex oppidō pontem flūminis interrumpēbant, quī erat ab oppidō mīlia passuum circiter tria (Caesar)
"upon his arrival there, he found five cohorts, whom Domitius had detached from the garrison, employed in breaking down a bridge about three miles distant from the town"

An alternative interpretation is that the cohorts began breaking up the bridge after Caesar arrived. In the following sentence, which has iam and the pluperfect, the situation is definitely already under way:

nam cum illō vēnisset, iam Agēsilāus multīs locīs expugnātīs magnā erat praedā potītus (Nepos)
"for by the time he got there, Agesilaus had already stormed many places and gained possession of a large amount of booty"

When both verbs are imperfect, the situations overlap in time:

cum sē in castra reciperent, adversīs hostibus occurrēbant (Caesar)
"while they were retreating into the camp, they kept meeting the enemy who were coming towards them"

==== Causal cum ====
Frequently, the meaning "when" shades into "since" and gives the cause of the action of the main verb. In some sentences, either interpretation (causal or temporal) is possible, while in others "seeing that" or "since" or "in view of the fact that" is better:

hīc paulīsper est pugnātum, cum irrumpere nostrī cōnārentur, illī castra dēfenderent (Caesar)
"at this point there was fighting for a short time, while/since our men were trying break into the camp, and the others were defending it"

Lūcius Petrosidius aquilifer, cum magnā multitudine hostium premerētur, aquilam intrā vallum prōiēcit (Caesar)
"Lucius Petrosidius the eagle-bearer, when/since he was being pressed by a great multitude of enemies, hurled his eagle inside the camp wall"

Haeduī, cum sē suaque ab iīs dēfendere non possent, lēgātōs ad Caesarem mittunt rogātum auxilium (Caesar)
"the Haedui, since they were unable to defend themselves and their property from them, sent envoys to Caesar to ask for help"

cum esset inter bīna castra campus ..., Domitius castrīs Scīpiōnis aciem suam subiēcit (Caesar)
"since there was a plain between the two camps, Domitius arranged his battle line near Scipio's camp"

When cum is causal, it always takes the subjunctive even if it refers to present time:

quae cum ita sint (Cicero)
"in view of the fact that these things are so" / "since this is so"

==== Concessive cum ====
Another, less common, meaning is 'though" or "despite the fact that". The subjunctive is always used:

nihil mē adiūvit, cum posset (Cicero)
"he did nothing to help me, though (or: at a time when) he could have done"

hōc tōtō proeliō, cum ab hōrā septimā ad vesperum pugnātum sit, āversum hostem vidēre nēmō potuit (Caesar)
"in this whole battle, though the fight went on from the seventh hour to evening, no one could see the enemy turn their back"

The use of the subjunctive with the concessive meaning of cum is found even in very early Latin:

edepol, Cupīdō, quom tam pusillus sīs, nimis multum valēs (Naevius)
"by God, Cupid, although you're so small, you are too powerful!"

==== Adversative cum ====
Another category of cum clause argued for by some grammarians is known as "adversative", in which two situations are contrasted:

at hostēs, ubi prīmum nostrōs equitēs cōnspexērunt, quōrum erat V [quīnque] mīlium numerus, cum ipsī nōn amplius DCCC [octingentōs] equitēs habērent... (Caesar)
"but the enemy, as soon as they caught sight of our cavalrymen, of whom the number was 5000, while they themselves had not more than 800 cavalrymen..."

==== Generic cum ====
Just as the relative pronoun quī followed by the subjunctive can have a generic meaning ("the sort of person who..."), so cum can also be generic (i.e. "at such a time as..."). In the following sentence the verb after cum is imperfect subjunctive:

accēpit enim agrum temporibus iīs cum iacērent pretia praediōrum (Cicero)
"for he received the farm at one of those times when the prices of estates were low"

In the following, situated in future time, it is present subjunctive:

erit illud profectō tempus cum tū amīcissimī benevolentiam dēsīderēs (Cicero)
"I'm sure there will come a time when you will desire the services of a great friend"

==== "Heard someone saying" ====
In Latin, "I heard him saying" can be expressed as "I heard him while he was saying" (or: "I heard from him while he was saying"), using a cum clause with the subjunctive. This turn of phrase is used several times by Cicero:

audīvi ... Mētrodōrum cum dē iīs ipsīs rēbus disputāret (Cicero)
"I heard Metrodorus discussing these very matters"

saepe ex eō audīvī, cum sē scrībere neque consuēsse neque posse dīceret (Cicero)
"I have often heard him say that he was not accustomed or able to write them down"

It is also possible to use an accusative and infinitive to express this meaning:

Valerium Probum audīvī haec dīcere (Gellius)
"I once heard Valerius Probus say this"

Another way is to use a present participle:

Hērōdem Atticum ... Athēnīs disserentem audīvī Graecā ōrātiōne (Gellius)
I once heard Herodes Atticus giving a lecture in Greek in Athens"

==== cum with the indicative ====
Used with the indicative mood, the conjunction cum can mean "at that time when". This is known as 'temporal cum".

In the examples below, the events occur at exactly the same time, and the subjunctive could not be used:

cum tacent, clāmant (Cicero)
"when they are silent, (it is as if) they are shouting"

locō ille mōtus est, cum est ex urbe dēpulsus (Cicero)
"he was dislodged from his vantage point, (at that moment) when he was driven out of the city"

Clauses like the above are sometimes known as "clauses of equivalent action", since the action of the temporal clause is equivalent to the action of the main clause. The same grammar is used for other actions which occurred at an identical time:

cum occīditur Sex. Rōscius, ibīdem fuērunt (Cicero)
"when Sextus Roscius was murdered, they were also there"

nempe eō Rōmulus regiōnēs dīrēxit tum cum urbem condidit (Cicero)
"surely it is with this (rod) that Romulus marked out the regions of the sky at that time when he founded the city"

In the following, the verbs describe situations which occurred co-extensively and simultaneously. The main verb is perfect indicative, the temporal clause verb is imperfect indicative:

diēs trīgintā aut plūs eō in nāvī fuī, cum intereā semper mortem exspectābam miser (Terence)
"thirty days, or more than that, I was in the ship, while all the time I was miserably expecting death"

The following has perfect in the temporal clause, and the imperfect in the main clause:

Sulla cum Damasippum et alios ... iugulari iussit, quis non factum eius laudabat? (Sallust)
"at that time when Sulla ordered Damasippus and others to be put to death, who was not praising his action?"

In the following, both clauses have the imperfect indicative tense:

fulgentīs gladiōs hostium vidēbant Deciī, cum in aciem eōrum inruēbant (Cicero)
"the Decii could see the flashing swords of the enemy, at the same time as they were rushing upon their battleline"

tum, cum dīcēbās, vidēbam (Cicero)
"I could see it then, when you were speaking"

The following has cum with the imperfect indicative, but the perfect indicative in the main clause:

ad extrēmum vērō, cum iste iam dēcēdēbat, ... litterās ad eōs mīsit (Cicero)
"right at the end, just when the defendant was already leaving the province, Carpinatius sent letters to them..."

In other sentences, however, the cum clause seems more circumstantial:

Gallō autem nārrāvī, cum proximē Rōmae fuī, quid audīssem (Cicero)
"I told Gallus, last time I was in Rome, what I had heard"

maximā sum laetitiā adfectus, cum audīvī cōnsulem tē factum esse (Cicero)
"I was overcome with greatest joy when I heard that you had been made consul"

The following examples, where the context is similar, have cum with the subjunctive:

quibus dē rēbus ... nūper, cum essem in Tūsculānō, disputātum est (Cicero)
"concerning which we had a discussion recently when I was in my villa at Tusculum"

is cum audīsset dē suō (fīliō), fractus est (Cicero)
"when he heard about his own son, he was heart-broken"

==== Temporal cum with main clause imperfect ====
In the following examples, the temporal clause describes an event, while the main clause describes a situation which already existed at the time. The temporal clause verb is perfect or historic present indicative, the main clause verb is imperfect indicative:

cum Caesar in Galliam vēnit, alterīus factiōnis prīncipēs erant Aeduī, alterīus Sēquanī (Caesar)
"(at that time) when Caesar came into Gaul, the leaders of one faction were the Aedui, of the other, the Sequani"

eō cum veniō, praetor quiēscēbat (Cicero)
"when I got there, the governor was taking a nap"

==== fuit tempus cum ====
The phrase fuit tempus cum "there was a time when" can be followed by indicative or subjunctive; but the subjunctive is more common. The following example has the imperfect indicative:

fuit quoddam tempus, cum in agrīs hominēs passim bestiārum modō vagābantur (Cicero)
"there was a certain time when people used to roam around randomly in the countryside like wild animals"

While the following has imperfect subjunctive:

fuit anteā tempus, cum Germānōs Gallī virtūte superārent (Caesar)
"there was formerly a time when it was the Gauls who were superior to the Germans in fighting spirit"

==== cum of time how long ====
Another idiom using cum is the following, indicating how long a certain situation has persisted. The verb in both clauses is present indicative:

multī annī sunt cum in aere meō est (Cicero)
"he has owed me money for many years"

apud Graecōs quidem iam annī prope quadringentī sunt cum hoc probātur (Cicero)
"amongst the Greeks it is now nearly 500 years that this has been approved of"

iam diu est, cum quaerimus (Gellius)
"we have been searching for it for a long time now"

The length of time can also be expressed using an ordinal number:

vīcēsimus annus est cum mē petunt (Cicero)
"it is the twentieth year now that they have been attacking me"

In such sentences the cum clause can also have the perfect tense, as in the following example:

nōndum centum et decem annī sunt cum dē pecūniīs repetundīs lāta lēx est (Cicero)
"it is not yet a hundred and ten years since the law on extortion was passed"

minus quīndecim diēs sunt, quom prō hīsce aedibus minās quadrāgintā accēpistī ā Callicle (Plautus)
"it's less than 15 days since you received 40 minae from Callicles in front of this house"

The following example shows the same type of clause situated in past time, and uses the imperfect indicative and pluperfect indicative tenses:

permultī annī iam erant cum inter patriciōs magistrātūs tribūnōsque nūlla certāmina fuerant (Livy)
"for many years there had been no disputes between the patrician magistrates and the tribunes"

However, the length of time that a situation has gone on can also be expressed without using a cum clause. The main verb is present indicative:

is Lilybaeī multōs iam annōs habitat (Cicero)
"he has been living in Lilybaeum for many years now"

iam diū ignōrō quid agās; nihil enim scrībis (Cicero)
"for a long time now I've had no idea what you are doing, as you don't write anything"

==== Iterative cum ====
Clauses which refer to no definite occasion, but to generalised or repeated actions ("whenever..."), usually use the indicative mood; although from Livy onwards the subjunctive mood could also be used.

In present or indefinite time, if the two events are simultaneous, the present tense is used in both:

ferē cotīdiānīs proeliīs cum Germānīs contendunt, cum aut suīs fīnibus eōs prohibent aut ipsī in eōrum fīnibus bellum gerunt (Caesar)
"they fight almost daily battles with the Germans, whenever they are either keeping them out of their own territory, or themselves fighting in the Germans" territory"

hī, cum est ūsus... , omnēs in bellō versantur (Caesar)
"these, whenever there is need, all take part in the war"

ea quae nōbīs, cum Rōmae sumus, nārrāre nēmō audeat (Cicero)
"the sort of things which no one dares to tell me when(ever) I'm in Rome"

However, if the temporal clause event precedes the main clause event, the perfect indicative tense is used in the temporal clause:

cum superāvērunt, animālia capta immolant (Caesar)
"whenever they win (lit. "have won") a battle, they sacrifice the captured animals"

oppidum autem Britannī vocant, cum silvās impedītas vallō atque fossā muniērunt (Caesar)
"the Britons call it a "town", whenever they have fortified some dense woodland with a rampart and ditch"

In a past context, if the events are contemporaneous, the imperfect indicative is used in both clauses:

egō, cum ā nostrō Catōne laudābar, reprehendī mē ā cēterīs facile patiēbar (Cicero)
"personally, whenever I used to be praised by our friend Cato, I didn't at all mind (lit. "I was easily suffering") being criticised by other people"

But if one event is earlier than the other, the temporal clause has the pluperfect indicative, while the main clause is imperfect:

cum quaepiam cohors ex orbe excesserat atque impetum fēcerat, hostēs velōcissimē refugiēbant (Caesar)
"whenever any cohort left the circle and made an attack, the enemy would retreat very quickly"

cum rosam vīderat, tum incipere vēr arbitrābātur (Cicero)
"it was only when he saw (lit. "had seen") a rose that he used to reckon that spring was beginning"

In authors from the time of Livy onwards, however, the subjunctive is sometimes used in iterative clauses:

cum in iūs dūcī dēbitōrem vīdissent, undique convolābant (Livy)
"whenever they saw (lit. "had seen") a debtor being led to court, they used to flock together from all sides"

==== cum in a future context ====
A similar construction is also used in clauses referring to the future, whether or not they are iterative. In future sentences, where English uses a present tense in the temporal clause, the Latin idiom is to use the future tense in both clauses:

nārrābō cum aliquid habēbō novī (Cicero)
"I will let you know when (whenever) I have (lit. "will have") some news"

tū velim cum prīmum poteris tua cōnsilia ad mē scrībās (Cicero)
"I would like you to write me your plans as soon as you are able (lit. "will be able")"

But the future perfect indicative is used if the event in the temporal clause precedes the main event, as in the famous poem of Catullus describing the number of kisses he will ask for from his mistress Lesbia:

dein, cum mīlia multa fēcerīmus, conturbābimus illa (Catullus)
"then, after we have made (lit. "will have made") many thousands, we will muddle up the accounts"

plūribus verbīs ad tē scrībam, cum plūs ōtiī nāctus erō (Cicero)
"I'll write you a longer letter when I've got (lit. "will have got") more free time"

==== Inverted cum clause (cum inversum) ====
In some sentences the circumstances are given in the main clause, while the main event is in the cum clause, which always comes second. This is known as "cum inversum" or an inverted cum clause: Here cum is followed by a perfect or historic present indicative:

Hannibal iam subībat mūrōs, cum repentē in eum ērumpunt Rōmānī (Livy)
"Hannibal was already approaching the walls, when the Romans suddenly sallied out against him"

iamque hoc facere noctū apparābant, cum mātrēs familiae repentē in pūblicum prōcurrērunt (Caesar)
"they were already preparing to do this at night, when some married women suddenly ran out into the streets"

vix ea fātus erat, cum circumfūsa repentē scindit sē nūbēs (Virgil)
"scarcely had he spoken these words when suddenly the cloud which had been poured around them parted"

It has been argued that the cum inversum kind of temporal clause is an innovation of Latin, not found in other early Indo-European languages. In this type of sentence, there is typically an adverb such as iam "by now", vix "scarcely", or modo "just" in the main clause, and often a word such as repentē or subitō "suddenly" in the cum-clause, as in the above examples.

==== cum prīmum ====
The phrase cum prīmum means "as soon as" and it usually takes the indicative mood, just like ut or simulatque. The following example has the perfect indicative:

cum prīmum potuit, ad exercitum contendit (Caesar)
"as soon as he was able, he hurried to join the army"

Sometimes, however, it takes a subjunctive verb, like the ordinary historic cum. The verb inciperet below is imperfect subjunctive:

cum prīmum pābulī cōpia esse inciperet, ad exercitum vēnit (Caesar)
"as soon as there was beginning to be a sufficient supply of fodder, he came to the army"

The subjunctive is also used if the clause is part of indirect speech. In the following sentence both verbs are in the historic present tense, the first one subjunctive:

cum prīmum possit, in Venetōs proficīscī iubet (Caesar)
"he ordered him to set out for the Veneti as soon as he could"

Another meaning, also with the indicative, is "at that time when first":

minor est ista quam ego fuī, cum prīmum virum passa sum? (Petronius)
"is she younger than I was when I first slept with a man?"

ō sī habērēmus illōs leōnēs, quōs ego hīc invēnī, cum prīmum ex Asiā vēnī (Petronius)
"oh, if only we had those lions which I found here when I first came from Asia!"

==== "I remember when" ====
A temporal cum clause can be used after meminī "I remember":

fāma tamen meminī cum fuit ista mea (Ovid)
"but I remember when that fame was mine!"

meminī cum mihī dēsipere vidēbāre (Cicero)
"I remember the time when you used to seem to me to be lacking in common sense"

Meminī can also be followed by an accusative and infinitive construction, combined with a temporal cum clause:

multa illum disertē dīxisse meminī, cum intrōductus est ex carcere in senātum (Seneca the Elder)
"I remember that he made a long eloquent speech on that occasion when he was led from the prison into the senate"

Alternatively, meminī can take an accusative and infinitive accompanied by a circumstantial cum clause with the subjunctive:

meminī, cum pater in Macedoniā cōnsul esset et essēmus in castrīs, perturbārī exercitum nostrum religiōne et metū (Cicero)
"I remember that on one occasion when my father was consul in Macedonia and we were in the camp, our army was disturbed by superstition and fear"

meminī mē intrāre scholam eius, cum recitātūrus esset in Milōnem (Seneca the Elder)
"I remember going into his school at a time when he was just about to recite a speech against Milo"

The present infinitive (perturbārī, intrāre) is used in these last two examples, since the reminiscence is a personal one.

The indicative is used when the clause is more definite ("I remember that time when..."), while the subjunctive is less definite ("I remember a time when" or "I remember one of the times when...").

==== cum ... tum ====
The combination cum ... tum sometimes introduces a temporal clause, but more often means "both ... and" or "not only ... but also" or "just as ... so also":

multum cum in omnibus rēbus tum in rē mīlitārī potest fortūna (Caesar)
"Luck is an important factor in warfare, just as it is in all other matters"

=== postquam / posteāquam ===
==== With the perfect indicative ====
Another very common temporal conjunction is postquam (less commonly posteāquam or posteā quam, mainly in Cicero) "after". The most common use is when one event followed another, in which case postquam is usually followed by the perfect indicative:

eō postquam Caesar pervēnit, obsidēs popōscit (Caesar)
"after Caesar arrived there, he demanded hostages"

postquam tuās litterās lēgī, Postumia tua mē convēnit (Cicero)
"after I'd read your letter, your Postumia came to see me"

id postquam resciit, excanduit (Cicero)
"when he found this out, he was furious"

==== Time interval mentioned ====
The usual tense used with postquam is the perfect indicative, when the length of time is given the tense is usually pluperfect:

(Hamilcar) nōnō annō postquam in Hispāniam vēnerat occīsus est (Nepos)
"Hamilcar was killed in the ninth year after he came to Spain."

trīcēsimō die, postquam ā Persepolī profectus erat, eōdem redit (Curtius)
"on the thirtieth day after he had set out from Persepolis, he returned to the same place"

Sometimes post and quam are separated, and the time is put into the accusative case:

post diem tertium rēs gesta est quam dīxerat (Cicero)
"the business was accomplished on the third day after he had spoken"

Rarely, quam alone stands for postquam:

sextō, quam profectus erat, mēnse Rōmam rediit (Suetonius)
"he returned to Rome in the sixth month after he had set off"

posterō diē, quam illa erant ācta (Cicero)
"on the day after these things were done"

==== Main verb imperfect ====
Sometimes the main clause following a postquam clause is in the imperfect tense. In this case it does not represent a pre-existing situation, but a situation which began or which kept happening after the event in the postquam clause:

quō postquam fuga inclīnāvit, aliī arma foedē iactantēs in aquam caecī ruēbant (Livy)
"after the rout turned in this direction, some of them, shamelessly throwing off their armour, began rushing blindly into the water"

Gallī posteā quam propius successērunt, in scrobēs dēlātī trānsfodiēbantur (Caesar)
"after the Gauls approached nearer, they kept falling into the trenches and getting impaled"

==== postquam with the imperfect ====
Sometimes postquam is followed by an imperfect indicative tense. In this case the temporal clause describes not an event, but a situation which overlaps in time with the action of the main clause, as in the first example below:

postquam īnstrūctī utrimque stābant, cum paucīs procerum in medium ducēs prōcēdunt (Livy)
"once the soldiers on both sides were standing drawn up for battle, the generals, with a few of the nobles, came forward into the middle"

Such clauses often imply a spectator ("after he saw that...", "when it became clear that..."); they can also be considered "quasi-causal" ("in view of the fact that..."):

postquam nūlla spēs erat potiundī castrīs, signum receptuī dedit (Livy)
"in view of the fact that (or "after it became clear that") there was no hope of capturing the camp, he gave the signal to retreat"

tū, postquam quī tibī erant amīcī non poterant vincere, ut amīcī tibī essent quī vincēbant effēcistī (Cicero)
"after (you saw that) those who were your friends were unable to win, you made sure that those who were winning would be your friends"

A situation in the temporal clause can also be expressed using a pluperfect tense:

postquam parum vīs aperta prōfēcerat, mūnītiōnēs posterō diē circumdant (Livy)
"when (it became clear that) open force had not been successful, the following day they surrounded the defences"

==== "Since the time when" ====
The conjunction postquam or posteā quam can also mean "since". In this case the temporal clause describes how long the situation has been going on. When the main verb is negative, the perfect tense is used in the main clause:

Balbum, posteāquam tū es profectus, nōn vīdī (Cicero)
"I haven't seen Balbus since you left"

If the action is continuous, where English would use the perfect continuous tense, Latin uses the present tense in the main clause:

tremō horreōque postquam aspexī hanc (Terence)
"I've been trembling and shivering (lit. "I am trembling and shivering") ever since I caught sight of this woman"

In this kind of sentence, postquam can be followed by a present tense. In one of Martial's poems, the goddess Venus describes her hold over her lover Mars:

postquam meus est, nullā mē paelice laesit (Martial)
"ever since he has been (lit. "is") mine, he has never harmed me with a mistress"

It is even possible to have a present tense in both halves of the sentence, as in the following example from a letter to Atticus, in which Cicero complains about how few letters he's been getting since he left Rome:

nārrō tibī, plānē relēgātus mihī videor posteā quam in Formiānō sum (Cicero)
"I tell you, I have been feeling (lit. "I seem to myself") as if I'm completely in exile ever since I've been (lit. "I am") at my villa in Formiae"

==== "Now that" ====
Another possible translation in these sentences is "now that":

credēbam esse facile; tōtum est aliud posteā quam sum ā tē dīiūnctior (Cicero)
"I used to believe that it was easy, but it's a totally different matter now that I am further away from you"

summam dignitātem pavīmentāta porticus habēbat, quod mihī nunc dēnique appāruit, posteāquam et ipsa tōta patet et columnae polītae sunt (Cicero)
"the paved portico had the greatest elegance, as has now at last become clear to me, now that the portico itself is completely open and the columns have been polished"

The following example, in a past context, uses the pluperfect tense in the temporal clause:

alter consul, postquam moenibus iam Rōmānīs pulsō hoste perīculum esse dēsierat, et ipse ab Rōmā profectus (Livy)
"now that the enemy had been driven off and there had ceased to be any danger to the walls of Rome, the other consul also left the city"

==== Future time ====
Postquam is not used of future time in most classical writers, but is occasionally found in technical writers:

post diem tertium quam lēcta erit facitō (Cato)
"make (the oil) on the third day after (the olive) has been picked (lit. "will have been picked")"

=== ubi ===
The original meaning of ubi or ubī is "where" (it is related to ibī 'there"), and in questions it always means "where?" (the word for "when?" being quandō?); however, it can also introduce a temporal clause meaning "when" or "as soon as". In poetry, the i is usually short, but occasionally the original pronunciation ubī with a long i is found:

voltus ubī tuus / adfulsit populō, grātior it diēs (Horace)
"whenever your face has shone on the people, the day goes more pleasantly"

==== Past event ====
As with postquam, when ubi refers to a past event, it is usually followed by the perfect indicative:

id ubī dīxit, porcum saxō silice percussit (Livy)
"after he had said this, he struck the piglet with a flintstone"

A subjunctive verb after ubi may indicate indirect speech, as in the following example, where the subjunctive datum sit indicates that the words "when the signal is given" are part of the order, that is, they indicate when the shout was to be raised, not when the order was given:

ubī signum datum sit clāmōrem omnēs tollere iubet (Livy)
"he ordered them all to raise a shout when the signal should be given"

The main verb following a non-iterative ubi clause in past time is almost always perfect or historic present. Very rarely, however, it can be an imperfect. In this case, as after postquam clauses, it describes a situation which is not pre-existing but which arises subsequent to the temporal clause event:

ubī nuntiātum Coriolānō est adesse ingēns mulierum agmen, multō obstinātior erat (Livy)
"when news was brought to Coriolanus that a huge crown of women were present, he was even more obstinate (than he had been on the previous two occasions)"

The main verb can also be a historic infinitive, representing a situation:

nam Sēiānus ubi videt mortem Drūsī inultam interfectōribus, ... volūtāre sēcum quōnam modō Germānicī liberōs perverteret (Tacitus)
"when Sejanus saw that Drusus's death had been unavenged on his murderers, he began to turn over in his mind how he could cause the downfall of Germanicus's children"

==== Past situation ====
As with postquam, the imperfect indicative may occasionally be used after ubi, although this is not very common:

ubī lūx adventābat, ... dē imprōvīsō ... mīlitēs clāmõrem tollere atque portīs erumpere iubet (Sallust)
"when dawn was approaching, suddenly he ordered the soldiers to raise a shout and burst out of the gates"

In the examples below ubi means "after" or "since" ("in view of the fact that") rather than "while":

ubī nēmō obvius ībat, ad castra hostium tendunt (Livy)
"after (it became clear that) no one was coming to meet them, they headed for the camp of the enemy"

ubī obstinātam vidēbat et nē mortis quidem metū inclīnārī, addit ad metum dēdecus (Livy)
"when he saw that she was obstinate and not moved even by the fear of death, he added disgrace to fear"

==== "Whenever" ====
As with other conjunctions, a perfect indicative tense after ubi may be iterative. Thus in the following example, ubi vēnī does not mean "when I came" but "whenever I come":

ubī vēnī, causam ut ibi manērem repperit (Terence)
"whenever I come (lit. "have come"), she finds a reason for me to stay there"

In a past context, a pluperfect or imperfect indicative indicates an iterative situation:

ubī frūmentō opus erat, cohortēs praesidium agitābant (Sallust)
"whenever there was need for corn, the cohorts used to provide an escort"

ante iam doctī ab Iugurthā equitēs, ubi Rōmānōrum turma īnsequi coeperat, nōn cōnfertim neque in ūnum sēsē recipiēbant (Sallust)
"having been trained in advance by Jugurtha, the cavalrymen, whenever a squadron of Romans began to chase them, did not retreat in close formation or into one place"

From the time of Livy onwards, however, the subjunctive is also used in iterative clauses. In the following example, the tense of dīxisset is pluperfect subjunctive:

id ubī dīxisset, hastam in fīnēs eōrum ēmittēbat (Livy)
"whenever he had said this, he used to throw a spear into their territory"

This use of the subjunctive in temporal clauses of repeated action is generally not found before Livy. But Cicero uses the perfect subjunctive in the following sentence, probably because he is imagining a supposed case rather than a real one:

ubī semel quis pēierāverit, eī crēdī posteā nōn oportet (Cicero)
"once someone has perjured himself, he should never be believed again"

When the verb is a generalising 2nd person singular, the subjunctive is regularly used:

bonus segnior fit, ubī neglegās (Sallust)
"a good man gets lazier, if you neglect him"

==== "Where" ====
The other common meaning of ubi is "where". Often a word such as locus "place" or eō 'to that place" in the main clause gives the context for this meaning:

eōdem locō sepultus est, ubī vītam posuerat (Nepos)
"he was buried in the same place where he had laid down his life"

eō, ubī erat rēx, vēnit (Nepos)
"he reached the place where the king was"

==== ubicumque ====
The longer form ubicumque "wherever" is nearly always used not of time but of place in classical Latin.

ubicumque vīcit Rōmānus, habitat (Seneca)
"wherever the Roman has conquered, he inhabits"

=== ut ===
==== "As soon as, when" ====
The conjunction ut "as", "as soon as" has various meanings; when it introduces a temporal clause it is followed by an indicative mood. It is often followed by a perfect indicative such as vīdit "he saw" or vēnit "he came":

Pompēius ut equitātum suum pulsum vīdit, aciē excessit (Caesar)
"as soon as Pompey saw that his cavalry had been routed, he left the battle-line"

A common meaning is "as soon as", with another event following immediately:

ut herī mē salūtāvit, statim Rōmam profectus est (Cicero)
"as soon as he had paid his respects to me yesterday, he immediately set out for Rome"

==== "As, while" ====
It can also mean "as" or "while", when followed by the imperfect indicative:

ut Hortēnsius domum redūcēbātur ē campō, fit obviam eī C. Cūriō (Cicero)
"when Hortensius was being led back home from the election ground, he was met by Gaius Curio"

==== Main verb imperfect ====
An ut clause with the perfect indicative can be followed by an imperfect indicative. Just as when a cum clause with the perfect indicative is followed by an imperfect, the imperfect describes a pre-existing situation:

ut vērō domum vēnī, iacēbat mīles meus in lectō (Petronius)
"when I got home, my soldier was lying in bed"

Contrast the same tense used after a postquam or ubi clause, where the imperfect tense describes a subsequent situation (see above).

==== "As" (manner) ====
Another frequent, non-temporal, meaning of ut with the indicative is "as":

ut ante dēmōnstrāvimus (Caesar)
"as we showed earlier"

Ut is not used in sentences in future time.

==== utcumque ====
The word utcumque usually means "in whatever way", but there are a few places where it is used in a temporal sense to mean "whenever", as in this hymn to the Muses:

utcumque mēcum vōs eritis, libēns īnsānientem nāvita Bosporum temptābō (Horace)
whenever you are with me, I will willingly attempt the raging Bosporus as a sailor"

=== simul atque / simul ac ===
==== Past context ====
The conjunction simul atque or simul ac, also written as one word, is used in the same way as postquam or ubi. When the sentence refers to a single occasion in the past, the tense in the temporal clause is perfect indicative, as in the following examples:

simul atque īre in exilium iussus est, pāruit (Cicero)
"as soon as he was ordered to go into exile, he obeyed"

nōn dubitāvit, simulac cōnspexit hostem, cōnflīgere (Nepos)
"as soon as he caught sight of the enemy, he did not hesitate to join battle"

Verrēs, simul ac tetigit prōvinciam, statim Messānā litterās dedit (Cicero)
"as soon as he touched the province, Verres sent a letter from Messana"

Sometimes simul alone is used, as in the following example:

nostrī, simul in āridō cōnstitērunt, in hostēs impetum fēcērunt (Caesar)
"as soon as our men stood on dry land, they attacked the enemy"

==== Future context ====
The future perfect can be used in reference to future time. Here Cicero writes to his friend Atticus:

Varrōnī, simul ac tē vīderō, sī tibī vidēbitur, mittam (Cicero)
"I shall send the book to Varro as soon as I have seen you, if you approve"

simul ac cōnstituerō, ad tē scrībam (Cicero)
"as soon as I have decided, I will write to you"

==== Iterative ====
In the following example, which describes the character of Alcibiades, the pluperfect and imperfect tenses are used in the temporal clause in an iterative sentence in past time:

cum tempus pōsceret, labōriōsus, patiēns...; īdem, simulac sē remīserat neque causa suberat quārē animī labōrem perferret, luxuriōsus, dissolūtus, libīdinōsus, intemperāns reperiēbātur (Nepos)
"when the occasion demanded, he could be hardworking and put up with hardship...; but as soon as he had relaxed and there was no particular reason to make an effort, he was given over to extravagance, dissolute living, lust, and intemperance"

=== dum ===
==== "While" ====
When dum means "while this was happening", explaining the background circumstances of the action in the main clause, it tends to be followed by the present indicative, even in a past context:

dum haec Rōmae aguntur, cōnsulēs ambō in Liguribus gerēbant bellum (Livy)
"while these things were being done (lit. are being done) in Rome, both consuls were waging war amongst the Ligurians"

haec dum aguntur, intereā Cleomenēs iam ad Pelōrī lītus pervenerat (Cicero)
"while this was going on, meanwhile Cleomenes had arrived at the shore of Pelorus"

dum redeō, Hortēnsius vēnerat (Cicero)
"while I was on the way back, Hortensius had come"

In the following example, fūgit "she fled" is perfect tense, but fugit "she is fleeing", with a short u, is present tense:

fūgit in antrum, dumque fugit, tergō vēlāmina lāpsa relīquit (Ovid)
"(Thisbe) fled into a cave, but while she was fleeing (lit. "is fleeing"), her cloak slipped off her back and she left it behind"

However, other tenses are sometimes possible, such as the perfect in the following example:

haec Capuae dum fuī cognōvī (Cicero)
"I learnt this while I was in Capua"

The following has the pluperfect:

dum in ūnam partem oculōs animōsque hostium certāmen āverterat, scālīs capitur mūrus (Livy)
"while the contest had turned away the eyes and minds of the enemy in one direction, the wall was captured using ladders"

In the following the imperfect indicative is used:

quae dīvīna rēs dum cōnficiēbātur, quaesīvit ā mē vellemne sēcum in castra proficīscī (Nepos)
"while the sacrifice was being carried out, he asked me whether I would like to set out with him for the camp"

A clause with dum can also be iterative:

dum legō, assentior (Cicero)
"whenever I am reading, I tend to agree (with what is written)"

Dum with the present indicative can also be used in a future context. Pliny the Younger pleads with a sick friend to write frequently:

erō enim sēcūrior dum legō, statimque timēbō cum lēgerō (Pliny)
"for while I'm reading your letters I will feel relieved, but whenever I have finished reading them I will immediately be afraid again"

==== dum "while" with the subjunctive ====
In republican Latin, the verb in a dum clause, just as with other temporal clauses, was changed into the subjunctive mood when in indirect speech (imperfect subjunctive in a past context, present subjunctive in a present or future context).

sē quisque cōnspicī, dum tāle facinus faceret, properābat (Sallust)
"everyone was eager that he should be noticed while performing such an exploit"

eius pontis, dum ipse abesset, custōdēs relīquit prīncipēs (Nepos)
"he left the princes in charge of that bridge, while he was away" (i.e. until he got back)

However, in Tacitus, there are some exceptions, when the present indicative is retained.

In some authors also, such as Livy and later writers, as well as poets such as Virgil, dum can take the same construction as circumstantial cum, even when not in indirect speech, using the imperfect subjunctive:

illa, dum tē fugeret, hydrum nōn vīdit in herbā (Virgil)
"while she was fleeing from you, she failed to see a snake in the grass"

==== "As long as" ====
The imperfect indicative after dum usually means "as long as X was happening", referring to two situations which happened at an identical time:

fuit haec gēns fortis dum Lycūrgī lēgēs vigēbant (Cicero)
"this nation was brave as long as Lycurgus's laws were in force"

In the above example, the perfect indicative tense fuit "it was" implies that the period of Sparta's greatness is now over.

In the following, both clauses have the imperfect indicative tense:

nec enim, dum eram vōbīscum, animum meum vidēbātis (Cicero)
"nor, during that time I was with you, could you see my soul"

dum longius ab mūnītiōne aberant Gallī, plūs multitūdine tēlōrum prōficiēbant (Caesar)
"as long as the Gauls were at a distance from the fortifications, they were producing a greater effect with the superior number of their weapons"

Other tenses can be used, such as the future indicative in both halves of the following example:

Gracchus tam diū laudābitur, dum memoria rērum Rōmānārum manēbit (Cicero)
"Gracchus will continue to be praised for as long as the memory of Roman history remains"

The following has the present indicative in both halves:

dum anima est, spēs esse dīcitur (Cicero)
"it is said that as long as there is life, there is hope"

In the following, both tenses are perfect indicative:

spērāvimus ista, dum fortūna fuit
"we hoped for those things, as long as fortune was with us"

iī, dum parī certāmine rēs gerī potuit, magnum hostium numerum paucī sustinuēre (Caesar)
"for as long as it was possible to fight on equal terms, a few men withstood a large number of enemy"

==== "Until" ====
The conjunction dum can also mean "until". In the following, it is used with the present indicative:

dēlīberā hoc dum ego redeō (Terence)
"think about this until I get back"

More frequently in this meaning it is followed by the subjunctive. In sentences of this kind there is often an idea of "waiting for something to happen":

lupus observāvit dum dormitārent canēs (Plautus)
"the wolf kept watch until the dogs were dozing"

nē exspectētis dum hāc domum redeam viā (Plautus)
"don't expect me to return home by this same road"

dum rēs cōnficerētur, procul in praesidiō fuit (Nepos)
"while the murder was being carried out (i.e. until the business could be completed), he was far away on guard duty"

Vergīnius dum collēgam cōnsuleret morātus (est) (Livy)
"Verginius waited until he had a chance to consult his colleague"

scrībis in Italiā tē morātūrum dum tibī litterae meae veniant (Cicero)
"you write that you are intending to stay in Italy until a letter for you arrives from me"

==== "Provided that" ====
Another meaning with the subjunctive is "as long as" in the sense "provided that" (dummodō may also be used in this meaning):

ōderint, dum metuant (Accius)
"let them hate, provided that they fear"

The negative in such provisional clauses is nē:

sī cui videor segnior fuisse, dum nē tibī videar, nōn labōrō (Cicero)
"if I seem to have been a bit lazy, I'm not worried, so long as I don't seem that way to you"

=== dōnec ===
Other conjunctions which have similar meanings to dum are dōnec and quōad. Dōnec is never used by Caesar, and almost never by Cicero, but it is very common in later writers such as Livy, Pliny the Elder, and Tacitus.

==== "Until" ====
The original meaning of dōnec is "until". In the following example, referring to a future situation, it is followed by a future perfect tense:

haud dēsinam dōnec perfēcerō hoc (Terence).
"I will not stop until I have finished this"

Referring to the past, the perfect indicative may be used:

ille ferrō viam facere, dōnec ad portam perrēxit (Livy)
"using the knife he forced his way, until he reached the gate"

As with dum, if there is some idea of waiting for something to happen, the subjunctive is used:

Thrāces nihil sē movērunt, dōnec Rōmānī trānsīrent (Livy)
"the Thracians did not move at all, until the Romans had crossed"

iubet Sp. Larcium ad portam Collīnam stāre dōnec hostis praetereat (Livy)
"he ordered Spurius Larcius to stand at the Colline Gate until the enemy passed by"

eōsque ibī sedēre atque opperīrī prope ad merīdiem, dōnec discipulī nocturnum omne vīnum ēdormiant (Gellius)
(he said) they sit there and wait nearly until midday, until their pupils have had a chance to sleep off all their wine of the night before"

dōnec cicātrīx sit, vīnctum esse dēbet (Celsus)
"until it scars over, it should be kept in a bandage"

==== "While, as long as" ====
From the Augustan period onwards it can also mean "while" or "as long as":

dōnec grātus eram tibī ... Persārum viguī rēge beātior (Horace)
"as long as I was pleasing to you ... I flourished more blessed than the king of the Persians"

dōnec armātī cōnfertīque abībant, peditum labor in persequendō fuit (Livy)
"as long as they were retreating still armed and packed together, it was the infantry's task to pursue them"

In the above examples, the imperfect tense is used in the temporal clause, since it describes to a situation, but the perfect tense is used in the main clause, as is usual in Latin when the length of time a situation lasted is given.

=== dōnicum, dōnique ===
An early form of dōnec, but rarely used, was dōnicum (which is found in Cato, Plautus and once in Nepos). In the following example, referring to the future, dōnicum is followed by a future perfect:

egō mē āmittī, dōnicum ille hūc redierit, nōn postulō (Plautus)
"I don't request to be released until he gets back here"

Another rare form is dōnique, used four times in Lucretius and four times in Vitruvius but otherwise not found. In this example it is followed by a pluperfect indicative:

horriferīs accībant vōcibus Orcum, / dōnique eōs vītā prīvārant vermina saeva (Lucretius)
"with horrifying cries they would call for Death, until cruel agonies had deprived them of life"

=== quoad ===
==== "As long as" ====
The word quoad can have a non-temporal meaning ("to the extent that", "as far as"), but it can also be used in a temporal sense, meaning "as long as". When referring to the past it is regularly followed by the perfect indicative tense:

quoad potuit, fortissimē restitit (Caesar)
"as long as he was able, he put up a very brave resistance"

quoad Pompēius in Italiā fuit, spērāre nōn dēstitī (Cicero)
"as long as Pompey was in Italy, I didn't give up hope"

==== "Until" ====
Another meaning is "until":

Milō ... in senātū fuisset eō diē quoad senātus est dīmissus (Cicero)
"Milo had been in the senate on that day up until the time when the senate was dismissed"

When referring to the future, just as with cum clauses, the future or future perfect tense is used where English has a present tense:

nōn faciam fīnem rogandī quoad nōbīs nūntiātum erit tē id fēcisse (Cicero)
"I shan't stop asking until I hear (lit. "it will have been reported to us") that you have done it"

In the following sentence, the pluperfect subjunctive is used, as if the sentence is reported speech ("I will stay until I have learned"), known as "virtual ōrātiō oblīqua":

ipse intereā, quoad mūnīta hīberna cognōvisset, in Galliā morārī cōnstituit (Caesar)
"he himself decided to stay in Gaul until he had learnt that the winter-quarters had been fortified"

=== quamdiū ===
Another conjunction meaning "while" or "as long as" is quamdiū or quam diū. When referring to the past, it is frequently followed by a perfect indicative:

tenuit sē ūnō locō, quamdiū hiēms fuit (Nepos)
"he stayed in one place, for as long as it was winter"

It can also refer to the present, with the present tense:

quamdiū intrā mūrōs fluit, nōmen suum retinet (Curtius)
"for as long as it flows inside the walls, (the river) retains its name"

In the following example, the tense is future:

discēs, quam diū volēs (Cicero)
"you will learn for as long as you wish"

In the following, the imperfect indicative is used:

ita senēscere oportet virum, quī ... tōtum sē rēī pūblicae quam diū decēbat obtulerit (Pliny)
"this is how a man should grow old, who has devoted himself completely to the republic for as long as was fitting"

The original meaning is "how long?" or "how long...!", and this meaning is also found.

=== quotiēns / quotiēnscumque ===
The adverb quotiēns means "how often" or "as often as"; but it can also be used as a conjunction meaning "whenever", as in the following example:

quotiēns forās īre volō, mē retinēs (Plautus)
"whenever I want to go out, you hold me back"

Cicero often writes quotiēnscumque in this meaning. In the following example, the verb is in the perfect tense:

adhibuī dīligentiam, quotiēnscumque senātus fuit, ut adessem (Cicero)
"I made sure I was present every time there was a meeting of the senate"

As with other conjunctions which mean "whenever", Livy tends to use the subjunctive in iterative clauses:

cum abessem, quotiēnscumque patria in mentem venīret, haec omnia occurrēbant (Livy)
"while I was away, whenever I remembered my country, all these things used to occur to me"

=== quandō / quandōcumque ===
The word quandō is often interrogative ("when?") but sometimes, especially in early Latin, it can be a temporal conjunction. It is usually followed by an indicative verb:

versipellem sē facit quandō lubet (Plautus)
"he changes his appearance whenever he feels like it"

In other sentences, the meaning shades into "seeing that" or "since":

quandō habeō multōs cognātōs, quid opus sit mihī līberīs? (Plautus)
"since/when I have lots of relatives, what need do I have of children?"

The iterative form quandōcumque is used by some authors, but it is rare:

(febris) quandōcumque nōn accessit, balneum tūtum est (Celsus)
"whenever the fever hasn't appeared, it is safe to take a bath"

Quandōcumque can also be an adverb meaning "one day (whenever that may be)", as if quandōcumque is short for quandōcumque erit:

sī tamen haec superī cernunt ... quandōcumque mihī poenās dabis (Ovid)
"but if the gods see these things, ... one day you will pay me the penalty"

=== priusquam / antequam ===
The conjunctions priusquam (or prius quam) and antequam (ante quam) both mean "before". After a negative verb in the main clause, they can be translated with "until". Both are very common, although some authors prefer one (for example, Caesar almost always uses priusquam). Very rarely anteā quam is found. Another similar conjunction is prīdiē quam "on the day before".

==== Separation of prius and quam ====
If the main clause comes first, the conjunction is often split up, with prius or ante being placed before the verb in the main clause. This is especially so if the priority is emphasised as in the following example:

sē prius in Galliam vēnisse quam populum Rōmānum (Caesar)
"(he said that) he had come to Gaul earlier than the Roman people (had done)"

The separation is also common in negative sentences:

non prius abeunt quam aliquid scrīpserint (Apuleius)
"they don't go away until they have written something"

==== Past reference ====
When referring to the past, a temporal clause with priusquam or antequam usually has the subjunctive, especially from the time of the emperor Augustus onwards. However, some sentences use the perfect indicative, especially those which are negative, such as the following:

neque prius fugere dēstitērunt, quam ad flūmen Rhēnum pervēnērunt (Caesar)
"and they did not stop fleeing until they reached the river Rhine"

nec ostendērunt bellum prius quam intulērunt (Livy)
"and they showed no sign of war until they actually invaded"

ratiōnēs ad aerārium, antequam Dolābella condemnātus est, non audet referre (Cicero)
"he did not dare to return the account books to the treasury until Dolabella had been condemned"

Sometimes the verb is indicative even in an affirmative sentence:

vēnistī īrātus omnibus; quod egō, simul ac tē aspexī, prius quam loquī coepistī, sēnsī atque prōvīdī (Cicero)
"you came angry with everyone; which I realised and foresaw as soon as I saw you, before you began to speak"

When the sentence mentions a time interval, the use of the indicative more likely:

id āctum est praetōre mē, quīnquenniō ante quam cōnsul factus sum (Cicero)
"this happened when I was praetor, in the fifth year before I became consul"

Hērāclīō, aliquantō ante quam est mortuus, omnia trādiderat (Cicero)
"shortly before he died, he had handed over everything to Heraclius"

prīdiē quam egō Athēnās vēnī Mytilēnās profectus erat (Cicero)
"on the day before I reached Athens he had already departed for Mytilene"

However, there are also types of sentences where the subjunctive is required even in the republican period, for example where one action is done with the hope of preventing another:

(collem) celeriter, priusquam ab adversāriīs sentiātur, commūnit (Caesar)
"he quickly put a fortification round the hill before it could be noticed by the enemy"

Similarly, the subjunctive is used if the meaning is "before there was a chance for something to happen":

antequam verbum facerem, dē sellā surrēxit atque abiit (Cicero)
"before I could say anything, he got up from his chair and departed"

multī prius incendiō absūmpti sunt, quam hostium adventum sentīrent (Livy)
"many died in the fire before they noticed the arrival of the enemy"

The following has the pluperfect subjunctive:

deinde Serāpiōn cum epistulā tuā; quam prius quam aperuissem, dīxī eī tē ad mē dē eō scrīpsisse anteā (Cicero)
"then came Serapion with your letter; even before I had opened it, I told him that you had written to me about him previously"

Another reason for the subjunctive is if there is an idea of insistence ("he refused to leave before conquering..."):

neque prius inde discessit, quam tōtam īnsulam bellō dēvinceret (Nepos)
"and he did not depart from there until he had conquered the entire island"

The subjunctive became more common, and in authors from the time of Livy onwards it is used often without any particular justification. For example, in the following sentences, the relation is purely temporal:

ducentīs annīs ante quam urbem Rōmam caperent, in Italiam Gallī trānscendērunt (Livy)
"it was two hundred years before they captured the city of Rome that the Gauls crossed into Italy"

prius quam prōvinciā dēcēderet, cōnsilium iniit nefandae atrōcitātis (Suetonius)
"before he left the province, he entered upon a plan of appalling atrocity"

==== Generalising present ====
A generalising sentence with priusquam or antequam in present time regularly has the present subjunctive, if affirmative:

ante vidēmus fulgōrem quam sonum audiāmus (Seneca the Elder)
"we see a flash before we hear the sound"

The following generalisation shows the present subjunctive after antequam contrasted with the present indicative after cum:

dūrum est, Sexte, negāre, cum rogāris,
quantō dūrius, antequam rogēris! (Martial)
"it's hard to say no when you are asked, Sextus,
but even harder before you are asked!"

Sometimes, however, the perfect indicative may be used in a generalisation, as in the following:

membrīs ūtimur priusquam didicimus cuius ea ūtilitātis causā habeāmus (Cicero)
"we use our limbs before we learn (lit. "we have learnt") for the sake of what purpose we have them"

When the main verb is negative, the perfect indicative is regular:

prius quam in os iniecta glaeba est, locus ille, ubi cremātum est, nihil habet religiōnis (Cicero)
"until earth is (has been) thrown onto a bone, the place where it was cremated is not holy"

==== Future reference ====
Referring to the future, a simple present indicative can be used in the temporal clause in sentences such as the following:

antequam ad sententiam redeō, dē mē pauca dīcam (Cicero)
"before I return to the subject, I will say a few words about myself"

numquid prius quam abeō mē rogātūrus es? (Plautus)
"before I go, is there anything you want to ask me?"

The future simple is not used in these clauses. However, the future perfect is used if the main verb is negative:

nihil contrā disputābō priusquam dīxerit (Cicero)
"I shall make no counter-arguments until he has spoken (lit. "before he will have spoken")"

certī cōnstituere nihil possum prius quam tē vīderō (Cicero)
"I can't decide anything for sure until I see you (lit. "I will have seen you")"

==== Indirect speech ====
In indirect or reported speech, the subjunctive is used in the temporal clause. However, in the following sentence the verb redīrent is understood from the context, and only an ablative absolute remains:

negant sē inde prius quam captā urbe hostium reditūrōs esse (Livy)
"they said that would not return from there until the enemies" city had been captured"

==== Commands and wishes ====
The subjunctive is usual if the main verb is an imperative:

sī mē amās, prius quam proficīscāris effice (Cicero)
"if you love me, do it before you leave"

priusquam hōc circulō excēdās, ... redde respōnsum (Livy)
"before you step outside this circle, give your response"

But the following has the indicative:

dā sāvium etiam prius quam abīs (Plautus)
"give me a kiss before you go"

The subjunctive may also be used if the main verb is itself subjunctive, expressing a wish:

hunc vīcīnum prius conveniam quam domum redeam (Plautus)
"I'd like to meet this neighbour before I go home"

However, the following wish has the present indicative in the temporal clause:

pater omnipotēns adigat mē fulmine ad umbrās / ante, pudor, quam tē violō (Virgil)
"may the Father Almighty drive me to the shadows with a thunderbolt / before I violate you, o Modesty!"

== Temporal clause equivalents ==
As well as temporal clauses, Latin has other ways of expressing the time of the main action in a sentence, and which can substitute for a temporal clause.

=== Participle phrases ===
A participle phrase, or a simple participle, is often used as the equivalent of a temporal clause in Latin. Not every type of temporal clause can be replaced by a participle. The type which can be replaced are the circumstantial clauses with cum, or sometimes a future indefinite cum clause.

==== Present participle ====
The present participle is the equivalent of cum with the imperfect subjunctive:

Platō scrībēns est mortuus (Cicero)
"Plato died while he was writing"

The participle can be in any case, depending on whichever noun it agrees with. In the following sentence, it is in the genitive case:

haec dīcentis latus hastā trānsfīxit (Curtius)
"while (Clitus) was saying this, (the king) stabbed him in the side with the spear"

Literally "he pierced with a spear the side of him (as he was) saying these things".

==== Perfect participle ====
The perfect participle is the equivalent of cum with the pluperfect subjunctive:

Orchomeniīs missus subsidiō, occīsus est ā Thēbānīs (Nepos)
"after being sent to help the people of Orchomenus, he was killed by the Thebans"

==== Ablative absolute ====
When the phrase is in the ablative case, as in the example below, it is known as an ablative absolute. Such phrases most commonly use the perfect participle, but the present participle can also be used:

cognitō Caesaris adventū Ariovistus lēgātōs ad eum mittit
"when he learnt of Caesar's arrival (lit. "with Caesar's arrival learnt of"), Ariovistus sent envoys to him"

fīēs nōbilium tū quoque fontium mē dīcente cavīs inpositam īlicem saxīs (Horace)
"you too will become one of the noble springs, when I speak of the ilex-tree placed over your hollow rocks"

nec dubitō quīn legente tē hās litterās cōnfecta iam rēs futūra sit. (Cicero)
"and I have no doubt that by the time you read this letter, the business will have been completed"

In view of the lack of a present participle of the verb sum "I am" in Latin, sometimes an ablative phrase alone, without a verb, can stand for a temporal clause:

puerulō mē (Nepos)
"when I was a small boy"

==== After a preposition ====
A participle phrase can sometimes follow a preposition of time:

facitō ante sōlem occāsum ut veniās (Plautus)
"make sure you come before the sun has set"

haec post exāctōs rēgēs domī mīlitiaeque gesta prīmō annō (Livy)
"these are the things that were done at home and on campaign in the first year after the kings were expelled"

=== Verbal nouns ===
Some verbal nouns, such as adventus "arrival" and reditus "return", can be used in phrases of time:

eius adventū Biturigēs ad Aeduōs lēgātōs mittunt subsidium rogātum (Caesar)
"on his arrival, the Bituriges sent envoys to the Aedui to ask for help"

Āfrānius paene omne frūmentum ante Caesaris adventum Ilerdam convexerat (Caesar)
"Afranius had gathered nearly all the corn in Ilerda before Caesar's arrival"

=== Relative clause ===
The ablative relative pronoun quō "on which" can be used to mean 'the day on which" or 'the time at which", and thus introduce a quasi-temporal clause, as in the following examples from the historian Curtius. The pluperfect subjunctive is used, as the clauses are included in a sentence of indirect speech:

at ille clāmitare coepit eōdem temporis mōmentō quō audīsset ad Philōtān dēcucurrisse (Curtius)
"but he began shouting that the very moment he'd heard he had run to report the matter to Philotas"

rūrsusque īnstitit quaerere, quotus diēs esset ex quō Nīcomachus ad eum dētulisset indicium. (Curtius)
"and again he kept on asking how many days it had been (lit. 'the how-many-eth day it was") since Nicomachus had brought the accusation to him"

The feminine quā is similarly used to refer to a night:

illā nocte, quā nūptiās fēcērunt (Petronius)
"on that night, on which they got married"

nocte, quā proficīscēbātur legiō (Tacitus)
"on the night when the legion was setting off"

=== Coordination ===
The cum inversum kind of temporal clause is sometimes expressed in poetry simply by two sentences joined by et, atque or -que "and", as in the following example from Virgil:

dīxerat ille, et iam per moenia clārior ignis audītur (Virgil)
"he had spoken, and now the fire was heard along the walls more loudly"

== Multiple temporal clauses ==
Temporal clauses and participial phrases standing for temporal clauses are especially common in historical writing. Nutting cites the following typical example from Julius Caesar, where a temporal clause with cum is placed between two participle phrases:

Germānī, post tergum clāmōre audītō, cum suōs interficī vidērent, armīs abiectīs .... sē ex castrīs ēiēcērunt. (Caesar)
"the Germans, having heard the shouting behind them, when they saw their comrades being killed, having cast down their weapons ... threw themselves out of the camp."

In Nepos comes this sentence with a temporal clause, an ablative absolute, and a main verb:

quem ut barbarī incendium effūgisse vīdērunt, tēlīs ēminus missīs, interfēcērunt (Nepos)
"whom when the barbarians saw that he had escaped the fire, by throwing missiles at him from long range, they killed"

Livy also writes sentences containing a mixture of participial and temporal clauses. The following sentence has four participles or participial phrases, a cum clause, and a postquam clause, followed by the main verb:

ubi exceptus benignē ab ignāris cōnsiliī, cum post cēnam in hospitāle cubiculum dēductus esset, amōre ardēns, postquam satis tūta circā sōpītīque omnēs vidēbantur, strictō gladiō, ad dormientem Lūcrētiam vēnit (Livy)
"where, having been welcomed politely by those who were ignorant of his plan, when after dinner he had been led into the guest bedroom, burning with love, after everything seemed safe round about and everyone seemed to be asleep, having drawn his sword, he came to the sleeping Lucretia"

In the following sentence by Cicero, two different temporal clauses, with ut and cum, follow each other:

ut vēnī in Arpīnās, cum ad mē frāter vēnisset, in prīmīs nōbīs sermō (isque multus) dē tē fuit. (Cicero)
"as soon as I reached my villa at Arpinum, after my brother had joined me, at first our conversation (and it was a long one) was about you"

Allen and Greenough cite this sentence from Livy, which consists of two temporal clauses, and no fewer than six perfect participles:

Volscī, exiguam spem in armīs aliā undique abscīsā cum temptāssent, praeter cētera adversa locō quoque inīquō ad pugnam congressī, inīquiōre ad fugam, cum ab omnī parte caederentur, ad precēs ā certāmine versī, dēditō imperātōre trāditīsque armīs sub iugum missī, cum singulīs vestīmentīs ignōminiae clādisque plēnī dīmittuntur. (Livy)
"the Volsci, the small hope they had in arms every other hope having been cut off, after they had made trial of (it), apart from other difficulties having also joined battle at a place unsuitable for fighting and even more unsuitable for fleeing, when they were being slaughtered on all sides, after turning from fighting to prayers, with their commander surrendered and their weapons handed over, having been sent under the yoke, with a single garment each, full of ignominy and disaster, they were allowed to depart."

These long sentences, in which a number of subordinate clauses and participle phrases are followed by a main verb, are known as "periods".

== Bibliography ==
- Bennett, Charles Edwin (1895). Latin Grammar, Boston; pp. 187–191.
- Gildersleeve, B. L. & Gonzalez Lodge (1895). Gildersleeve's Latin Grammar. 3rd Edition. (Macmillan); pp. 359–376.
- Greene, John (1907). "Emphasis in Latin Prose". The School Review, Nov., 1907, Vol. 15, No. 9, pp. 643–654.
- Greenough, J. B. et al. (1903). Allen and Greenough's New Latin Grammar for Schools and Colleges. Boston and London; pp. 350–359.
- Hullihen, Walter (1911a). "A Chapter from an Unpublished Latin Syntax, with Prefatory Discussion". The Classical Weekly, Vol. 4, No. 25 (Apr. 29, 1911), pp. 194–196. (A discussion of antequam / priusquam clauses.)
- Hullihen, Walter (1911b). "A Chapter from an Unpublished Latin Syntax, with Prefatory Discussion (Concluded)". The Classical Weekly, Vol. 4, No. 26 (May 6, 1911), pp. 203–205.
- Kennedy, Benjamin Hall (1871). The Revised Latin Primer. Edited and further revised by Sir James Mountford, Longman 1930; reprinted 1962; pp. 184–186.
- Lewis, C. T. & Short, C. (1879). A Latin Dictionary.
- Nutting, H. C. (1916). "Where the Latin Grammar Fails". The Classical Weekly, Vol. 9, No. 20 (Mar. 18, 1916), pp. 153–157.
- Nutting, Herbert C. (1920). "Notes on the Cum-Construction". The Classical Journal, Vol. 16, No. 1 (Oct., 1920), pp. 26–33.
- Nutting, H. C. (1933). "On the History of the Cum-Construction". The American Journal of Philology, Vol. 54, No. 1 (1933), pp. 29–38.
- Petersen, Walter (1931). 'The Evidence of Early Latin on the Subjunctive in Cum-Clauses". Classical Philology, Oct., 1931, Vol. 26, No. 4, pp. 386–404.
- Schlicher, J. J. (1909). 'the Temporal Cum-Clause and Its Rivals". Classical Philology Vol. 4, No. 3 (Jul., 1909), pp. 256–275.
- Smith, W. & Hall, T. D. (1871). English-Latin Dictionary.
- Steele, R. B. (1910). "Relative Temporal Statements in Latin". The American Journal of Philology, 1910, Vol. 31, No. 3, pp. 265–286.
- Viti, Carlotta (2013). 'The idiosyncrasy of the cum inversum and of Latin subordination'. In: Bodelot, Colette; Gruet-Skrabalova, Hana; Trouilleux, François. Morphologie, syntaxe et sémantique des subordonnants. Clermont-Ferrand: Presses universitaires Blaise Pascal, pp. 115–130.
- Woodcock, E.C. (1959), A New Latin Syntax, (Bristol Classical Press), pp. 172–195.
