= Carpinatia gens =

The gens Carpinatia was a Roman family towards the end of the Republic. It is best known from a single individual, Lucius Carpinatius, one of the publicani in Sicily during the government of Verres, with whom he was very intimate. Cicero describes him as pro-magister, or deputy manager of the publicani, and calls him a second Timarchides, referring to one of the chief agents of Verres in his robberies and oppressions.

== See also ==
- List of Roman gentes
