= Pronominal adverb =

Germanic language construct

A pronominal adverb is a type of adverb containing a pronominal element.

When used with respect to the Germanic languages, it refers to an adverb formed in replacement of a preposition and a pronoun by turning the former into a prepositional adverb and the latter into a locative adverb, joined together in reverse order. For example:

- For that → therefor (not therefore)
- In that → therein
- By this → hereby
- To this → hereto
- In which → wherein

== Usage in English ==
In modern English, pronominal adverbs are most commonly encountered in literary registers or in legal usage. They are used frequently by lawyers and drafters of legal documents primarily as a way of avoiding the repetition of names of things in the document (or sometimes as a self-reference to the document itself). For this reason, pronominal adverbs are often seen as a type of legal jargon.

== Usage in Dutch ==
In Dutch, pronominal adverbs are very common and are almost mandatory in many situations; neglecting to use them often makes a phrase sound unnatural to native speakers. Dutch maintains a three-way distinction of reference in its demonstrative pronouns, with pronouns for things close by and far away, and a third pronoun that is unspecific for distance. This distinction is faithfully reflected in the use of pronominal adverbs, and other pronouns also often have a corresponding adverbial form.

Pronoun	Pronoun + "met"	Meaning	Adverb	Adverb + "met"	Meaning
dat	met dat	with that	daar	daarmee	therewith
dit	met dit	with this	hier	hiermee	herewith
het	met het (very rare)	with it	er	ermee	therewith (unspecific)
wat	met wat	with what	waar	waarmee	wherewith
alles	met alles	with everything	overal	overal mee	everywhere with
iets	met iets	with something	ergens	ergens mee	somewhere with
niets	met niets	with nothing	nergens	nergens mee	nowhere with
