= Adjunct (grammar) =

Phrase that can be removed

In linguistics, an adjunct is an optional, or structurally dispensable, part of a sentence, clause, or phrase that, if removed or discarded, will not structurally affect the remainder of the sentence. Example: In the sentence John helped Bill in Central Park, the phrase in Central Park is an adjunct.

A more detailed definition of the adjunct emphasizes its attribute as a modifying form, word, or phrase that depends on another form, word, or phrase, being an element of clause structure with adverbial function. An adjunct is not an argument (nor is it a predicative expression), and an argument is not an adjunct. The argument–adjunct distinction is central in most theories of syntax and semantics. The terminology used to denote arguments and adjuncts can vary depending on the theory at hand. Some dependency grammars, for instance, employ the term circonstant (instead of adjunct), following Tesnière (1959).

The area of grammar that explores the nature of predicates, their arguments, and adjuncts is called valency theory. Predicates have valency; they determine the number and type of arguments that can or must appear in their environment. The valency of predicates is also investigated in terms of subcategorization.

== Examples ==
Take the sentence John helped Bill in Central Park on Sunday as an example:

1. John is the subject argument.
2. helped is the predicator.
3. Bill is the object argument.
4. in Central Park is the first adjunct.
5. on Sunday is the second adjunct.

An adverbial adjunct is a sentence element that often establishes the circumstances in which the action or state expressed by the verb takes place. The following sentence uses adjuncts of time and place:

Yesterday, Lorna saw the dog in the garden.

Notice that this example is ambiguous between whether the adjunct in the garden modifies the verb saw (in which case it is Lorna who saw the dog while she was in the garden) or the noun phrase the dog (in which case it is the dog who is in the garden). The definition can be extended to include adjuncts that modify nouns or other parts of speech (see noun adjunct).

== Forms and domains ==
An adjunct can be a single word, a phrase, or an entire clause.

Single word
She will leave tomorrow.

Phrase
She will leave in the morning.

Clause
She will leave after she has had breakfast.

Most discussions of adjuncts focus on adverbial adjuncts, that is, on adjuncts that modify verbs, verb phrases, or entire clauses like the adjuncts in the three examples just given. Adjuncts can appear in other domains, however; that is, they can modify most categories. An adnominal adjunct is one that modifies a noun: for a list of possible types of these, see Components of noun phrases. Adjuncts that modify adjectives and adverbs are occasionally called adadjectival and adadverbial.

the discussion before the game – before the game is an adnominal adjunct.
very happy – very is an "adadjectival" adjunct.
too loudly – too is an "adadverbial" adjunct.

Adjuncts are always constituents. Each of the adjuncts in the examples throughout this article is a constituent.

== Semantic function ==
Adjuncts can be categorized in terms of the functional meaning that they contribute to the phrase, clause, or sentence in which they appear. The following list of the semantic functions is by no means exhaustive, but it does include most of the semantic functions of adjuncts identified in the literature on adjuncts:

Causal – Causal adjuncts establish the reason for, or purpose of, an action or state.
- The ladder collapsed because it was old. (reason)

Concessive – Concessive adjuncts establish contrary circumstances.
- Lorna went out although it was raining.

Conditional – Conditional adjuncts establish the condition in which an action occurs or state holds.
- I would go to Paris, if I had the money.

Consecutive – Consecutive adjuncts establish an effect or result.
- It rained so hard that the streets flooded.

Final – Final adjuncts establish the goal of an action (what one wants to accomplish).
- He works a lot to earn money for school.

Instrumental – Instrumental adjuncts establish the instrument used to accomplish an action.
- Mr. Bibby wrote the letter with a pencil.

Locative – Locative adjuncts establish where, to where, or from where a state or action happened or existed.
- She sat on the table.

Measure – Measure adjuncts establish the measure of the action, state, or quality that they modify
- I am completely finished.
- That is mostly true.
- We want to stay in part.

Modal – Modal adjuncts establish the extent to which the speaker views the action or state as (im)probable.
- They probably left.
- In any case, we didn't do it.
- That is perhaps possible.
- I'm definitely going to the party.

Modificative – Modificative adjuncts establish how the action happened or the state existed.
- He ran with difficulty. (manner)
- He stood in silence. (state)
- He helped me with my homework. (limiting)

Temporal – Temporal adjuncts establish when, how long, or how frequent the action or state happened or existed.
- He arrived yesterday. (time point)
- He stayed for two weeks. (duration)
- She drinks in that bar every day. (frequency)

== Distinguishing between predicative expressions, arguments, and adjuncts ==
=== Omission diagnostic ===
The distinction between arguments and adjuncts and predicates is central to most theories of syntax and grammar. Predicates take arguments and they permit (certain) adjuncts. The arguments of a predicate are necessary to complete the meaning of the predicate. The adjuncts of a predicate, in contrast, provide auxiliary information about the core predicate-argument meaning, which means they are not necessary to complete the meaning of the predicate. Adjuncts and arguments can be identified using various diagnostics. The omission diagnostic, for instance, helps identify many arguments and thus many possible adjuncts as well. If a given constituent cannot be omitted from a sentence, clause, or phrase without resulting in an unacceptable expression, that constituent is not an adjunct. In contrast, if a given constituent can be omitted without affecting grammaticality or core meaning, that constituent is an adjunct. E.g.:

a. Fred certainly knows.
b. Fred knows. – certainly may be an adjunct (and it is).

a. He stayed after class.
b. He stayed. – after class may be an adjunct (and it is).

a. I know her.
b. I know. - the sentence is acceptable, but its meaning is changed entirely. Therefore, her is not an adjunct.

a. She trimmed the bushes.
b. *She trimmed. – the bushes is not an adjunct.

a. Jim stopped.
b. *Stopped. – Jim is not an adjunct.

=== Other diagnostics ===
Further diagnostics used to distinguish between arguments and adjuncts include multiplicity, distance from head, and the ability to coordinate. A head can have multiple adjuncts but only one object argument (=complement):

a. Bob ate the pizza. – the pizza is an object argument (=complement).
b. Bob ate the pizza and the hamburger. the pizza and the hamburger is a noun phrase that functions as object argument.
c. Bob ate the pizza with a fork. – with a fork is an adjunct.
d. Bob ate the pizza with a fork on Tuesday. – with a fork and on Tuesday are both adjuncts.

Object arguments are typically closer to their head than adjuncts:

a. the collection of figurines (complement) in the dining room (adjunct)
b. *the collection in the dining room (adjunct) of figurines (complement)

Adjuncts can be coordinated with other adjuncts, but not with arguments:

a. *Bob ate the pizza and with a fork.
b. Bob ate with a fork and with a spoon.

=== Optional arguments vs. adjuncts ===
The distinction between arguments and adjuncts is much less clear than the simple omission diagnostic (and the other diagnostics) suggests. Most accounts of the argument vs. adjunct distinction acknowledge a further division. One distinguishes between obligatory and optional arguments. Optional arguments pattern like adjuncts when just the omission diagnostic is employed, e.g.

a. Fred ate a hamburger.
b. Fred ate. – a hamburger is not an obligatory argument, but it could be (and it is) an optional argument.

a. Sam helped us.
b. Sam helped – us is not an obligatory argument, but it could be (and it is) an optional argument.

The existence of optional arguments blurs the line between arguments and adjuncts considerably. Further diagnostics (beyond the omission diagnostic and the others mentioned above) must be employed to distinguish between adjuncts and optional arguments. One such diagnostic is the relative clause test. The test constituent is moved from the matrix clause to a subordinate relative clause containing which occurred/happened. If the result is unacceptable, the test constituent is probably not an adjunct:

a. Fred ate a hamburger.
b. Fred ate. – a hamburger is not an obligatory argument.
c. *Fred ate, which occurred a hamburger. – a hamburger is not an adjunct, which means it must be an optional argument.

a. Sam helped us.
b. Sam helped. – us is not an obligatory argument.
c. *Sam helped, which occurred us. – us is not an adjunct, which means it must be an optional argument.

The particular merit of the relative clause test is its ability to distinguish between many argument and adjunct PPs, e.g.

a. We are working on the problem.
b. We are working.
c. *We are working, which is occurring on the problem. – on the problem is an optional argument.

a. They spoke to the class.
b. They spoke.
c. *They spoke, which occurred to the class. – to the class is an optional argument.

The reliability of the relative clause diagnostic is actually limited. For instance, it incorrectly suggests that many modal and manner adjuncts are arguments. This fact bears witness to the difficulty of providing an absolute diagnostic for the distinctions currently being examined. Despite the difficulties, most theories of syntax and grammar distinguish on the one hand between arguments and adjuncts and on the other hand between optional arguments and adjuncts, and they grant a central position to these divisions in the overarching theory.

== Predicates vs. adjuncts ==
Many phrases have the outward appearance of an adjunct but are in fact (part of) a predicate instead. The confusion occurs often with copular verbs, in particular with a form of be, e.g.

It is under the bush.
The party is at seven o'clock.

The PPs in these sentences are neither adjuncts nor arguments. The preposition in each case is, rather, part of the main predicate. The matrix predicate in the first sentence is is under; this predicate takes the two arguments It and the bush. Similarly, the matrix predicate in the second sentence is is at; this predicate takes the two arguments The party and seven o'clock. Distinguishing between predicates, arguments, and adjuncts becomes particularly difficult when secondary predicates are involved, for instance with resultative predicates, e.g.

That made him tired.

The resultative adjective tired can be viewed as an argument of the matrix predicate made. But it is also definitely a predicate over him. Such examples illustrate that distinguishing predicates, arguments, and adjuncts can become difficult and there are many cases where a given expression functions in more ways than one.

=== Overview ===
The following overview is a breakdown of the current divisions:

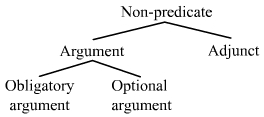

This overview acknowledges three types of entities: predicates, arguments, and adjuncts, whereby arguments are further divided into obligatory and optional ones.

== Representing adjuncts ==
Many theories of syntax and grammar employ trees to represent the structure of sentences. Various conventions are used to distinguish between arguments and adjuncts in these trees. In phrase structure grammars, many adjuncts are distinguished from arguments insofar as the adjuncts of a head predicate will appear higher in the structure than the object argument(s) of that predicate. The adjunct is adjoined to a projection of the head predicate above and to the right of the object argument, e.g.

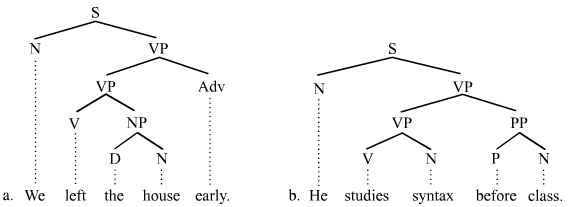

The object argument each time is identified insofar as it is a sister of V that appears to the right of V, and the adjunct status of the adverb early and the PP before class is seen in the higher position to the right of and above the object argument. Other adjuncts, in contrast, are assumed to adjoin to a position that is between the subject argument and the head predicate or above and to the left of the subject argument, e.g.

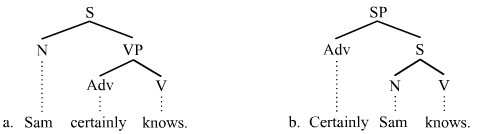

The subject is identified as an argument insofar as it appears as a sister and to the left of V(P). The modal adverb certainly is shown as an adjunct insofar as it adjoins to an intermediate projection of V or to a projection of S. In X-bar theory, adjuncts are represented as elements that are sisters to X' levels and daughters of X' level [X' adjunct [X'...]].

Theories that assume sentence structure to be less layered than the analyses just given sometimes employ a special convention to distinguish adjuncts from arguments. Some dependency grammars, for instance, use an arrow dependency edge to mark adjuncts, e.g.

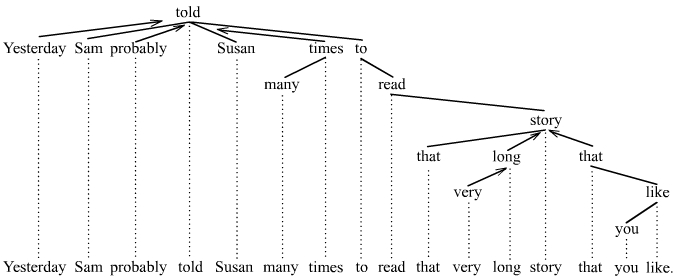

The arrow dependency edge points away from the adjunct toward the governor of the adjunct. The arrows identify six adjuncts: Yesterday, probably, many times, very, very long, and that you like. The standard, non-arrow dependency edges identify Sam, Susan, that very long story that you like, etc. as arguments (of one of the predicates in the sentence).

== See also ==
- Adverbial
- Argument
- Conjunct
- Disjunct
- Noun adjunct
- Predicate
- Predicative expression
- Attributive
