= Disjunct (linguistics) =

Word or phrase separable from adjacent syntax

In linguistics, a disjunct is a type of adverbial adjunct that expresses information that is not considered essential to the sentence it appears in, but which is considered to be the speaker's or writer's attitude towards, or descriptive statement of, the propositional content of the sentence, "expressing, for example, the speaker's degree of truthfulness or his manner of speaking."

A specific type of disjunct is the sentence adverb (or sentence adverbial, or attitude adverb), which modifies a sentence, or a clause within a sentence, to convey the mood, attitude or sentiments of the speaker, rather than an adverb modifying a verb, an adjective or another adverb within a sentence.

More generally, the term disjunct can be used to refer to any sentence element that is not fully integrated into the clausal structure of the sentence. Such elements usually appear peripherally (at the beginning or end of the sentence) and are set off from the rest of the sentence by a comma (in writing) and a pause (in speech).

== Examples ==
Here are some examples (note: the disjuncts that follow are 'sentence adverbs'):

- Honestly, I didn't do it. (Meaning "I'm honest when I say I didn't do it" rather than "I didn't do it in an honest way.")
- Fortunately for you, I have it right here.
- Frankly, this whole paragraph needs work.
- Interestingly, the comment made for a great topic of its own.
- Luckily, the amount of sugar the recipe called for was in stock in the pantry.
- Clearly, the mail did not come today due to it being a national holiday.
- Hopefully, we will have good weather on the trip.
- Unfortunately, by the time she reached the bus stop, the bus had already left.
- Sadly, not one of them survived.

Sometimes, the same word or phrase can be interpreted either as a disjunct or as a simple adjunct:

They seriously worked in an underground diamond mine run by Barbara.
Disjunct meaning: I'm serious when I say that they worked in an underground diamond mine ...
Adjunct meaning: They worked with seriousness...

An example of a sentence adverb modifying a sentence is: Unfortunately, when I got to the supermarket it had run out of the vegetable I like. An example of a sentence adverb modifying a clause within a sentence is: I liked the red car in the forecourt but, unfortunately, when I got to the dealer it was already sold.

"Unfortunately" thus communicates the regret or disappointment the speaker experiences and so manifests as a sentence adverb the sentiments of the speaker.

"Unfortunately", however, is only one of many sentence adverbs that can modify a speaker's attitude. Others include "mercifully," "gratefully," "oddly," "admittedly," etc.

=== Hopefully ===
"Hopefully" is an example of a word whose use as a disjunct ("it is hoped") is sometimes controversial.

=== (Most / More) importantly ===
This commonly used sentence adverbial phrase has been decried by some grammarians. Examples of its use, from the OED, are:

- 1941 Jrnl. Royal Aeronaut. Soc. 45 309 Just as importantly, the chart is of extreme value in forming any decisions as to the desirability of modifying‥the track.
- 1962 H. R. Williamson Day Shakespeare Died viii. 88 More importantly, Shakespeare, though using Holinshed as his main source, occasionally used Hall as the direct source of various passages.
- 1969 Nature 1 Nov. 477/1 Most importantly, when the particles of the pair are brought together, they annihilate.

Writers have claimed that the preferable phrase should be "more (or most) important". For instance, Washington State University English professor Paul Brians writes:

When speakers are trying to impress audiences with their rhetoric, they often seem to feel that the extra syllable in “importantly” lends weight to their remarks: “and more importantly, I have an abiding love for the American people.” However, these pompous speakers are wrong. It is rarely correct to use this form of the phrase because it is seldom adverbial in intention. Say “more important” instead. The same applies to “most importantly”; it should be “most important.”

However, Merriam-Webster write:

American commentators seem to object to the adverb and recommend the adjective.

and, after discussion, conclude

You can then use either the adjective or the adverb; both are defensible grammatically and both are in respectable use.

== See also ==
- Absolute construction – Word or phrase separable from adjacent syntax
- Conjunct – Semantic or grammatical clustering of words or expressions in linguistic analysis
- Dangling modifier – Type of misplaced grammatical phrase
- Intensive pronoun – Type of pronoun
