= Wired Style =

1996 internet style guide

- Author: Constance Hale; Jessie Scanlon (second edition)
- Genre: Style guide
- Publisher: Wired
- Publication date: 1996
- ISBN: 1-888869-01-1

Wired Style: Principles of English Usage in the Digital Age is an internet-focused style guide, published in 1996 by Wired magazine and written by Constance Hale (joined by Jessie Scanlon in the second edition). It was created to document rapid shifts in linguistic norms caused by the internet in its early phases. The book gives advice on style and usage, and has separate chapters defining internet neologisms. It most strongly advises to use a clear, direct writing voice similar to speaking style, and to disregard strict rules of writing. Contemporaneous reviews were largely negative, while retrospective reviews were more mixed.

== Background and publication ==
According to a Pew Research Center poll, 21% of Americans had visited the World Wide Web at least by 1995; by 1996, that number jumped to 73%. Since the 1990s, the internet has been a place of rapidly-shifting linguistic norms, a host for debate about those norms, and an influence on everyday speech. Amidst this backdrop, Wired magazine was launched in 1993, and quickly became influential in the Silicon Valley scene. Wired Style was written by journalist Constance Hale to document new language and norms on the internet, not just for journalists, but any kind of writing in the digital age.

Wired Style was first published in 1996, with a second run in 1999 authored by Hale and Jessie Scanlon. It had a green-and-black aesthetic and a wire binding. The book warned that the fast-changing norms of the internet would likely leave it with a short shelf life; to counteract that, a website companion was launched, hardwired.com. The website is defunct as of 2021, and little of it has been saved to the Internet Archive.

== Contents ==
Wired Style is made up of chapters giving advice on style and usage – calling its style "Way New Journalism" – and chapters defining internet neologisms, the latter of which take up four-fifths of the work in its second edition. In its style and usage advice, it strongly emphasizes the importance of writing voice, advising writers to be clear, brief, and direct. "In short, we celebrate voice. . . . It's the voice of quirky, individualist writers that best captures the quirky individualist spirit of the Net. The voice of people who write the way they talk." It lays down other suggestions on style and usage; however, it advises readers to write informally, anarchically, and even inconsistently, and to be an early adopter of linguistic change like dehyphenation. Neologisms it defines include jaggies, WTFIGO, pixel, userid, and spam; it leaves out terms like BTW, doxxing, WTF, and username.

== Reception ==
Contemporaneous reaction to Wired Style was largely negative. John Frazer Dobson, writing in Computer Shopper, puts the guide "on the other end of the usefulness spectrum", criticizing its disorganization. In response to the exhortation to writers to be brief and informal, Michael Hiltzik writes in the Los Angeles Times: "how does that explain the voice of Wired: self-important, meandering and elitist ... ?". Bryan A. Garner criticizes the book's loose approach to style in The New York Times, noting how it acted as if it was on a similar level to other style guides like The Chicago Manual of Style and "Elements of Style" while looking down on them. Charles R. Crawley, writing in Technical Communication, mostly praised the book, offering some of the same criticisms but noting that its emphasis on writing voice changed his own writing.

Retrospective analyses were more mixed, but agreed that the book's advice was in many ways dated. In Public Relations Quarterly in 2004, Alan Pell Crawford wrote that the perception of differences between print and web writing was as overhyped as websites that caused the dot-com bubble shortly after the Wired style guide was published. He also echoed many of the above writers' criticisms, saying that its advice on voice was standard for good journalistic writing. Annie Howard, writing in Slate in 2021, argues that while Wired Style may be "a strange anachronism" in design that holds a different era "in amber", its advice on writing voice was still a positive. Gretchen McCulloch, writing in The Toast, criticized the book's inconsistent and outdated approach to neologisms; however, she praises its libertarian advice, crediting it as the inspiration for her development of her personal style.
