= Influencer speak =

Speech pattern used in digital content

Influencer speak is a speech pattern commonly associated with English-speaking digital content creators, particularly on platforms such as TikTok. This style is characterized by linguistic features such as uptalk, where intonation rises at the end of declarative sentences, and vocal fry, a low, creaky vibration in speech. These features are often used to engage audiences.

== Characteristics ==
Influencer speak is commonly associated with:

- Uptalk – a rising intonation at the end of statements
- Vocal fry – a creaky sound often occurring at the end of sentences
- Use of filler words and slang – contributes to a conversational tone that resonates with audiences

== Origins ==
The origins of "influencer speak" are linked to the "Valley Girl" accent, which became prominent in the 1980s. This earlier style included features such as uptalk and vocal fry, which have been adapted for digital platforms.

Linguists have noted that these patterns are often led by young women.

== Sociolinguistic significance ==
"Influencer speak" is used to maintain audience engagement. Features such as uptalk help speakers retain the "conversational floor," ensuring continuous attention from listeners.

A study conducted by UCLA researchers has shown that creators adjust their speech styles based on the platform and audience. For example, a comedic tone may be emphasized on TikTok, while a more professional tone may be used on platforms such as LinkedIn or YouTube.

== See also ==
- Algospeak
- Algospeak (book)
- My Weekend as a 28-Year-Old in Chicago
