= The Triangles =

Australian indie pop band

Promotional graphic for 2010 release of The Triangles' "Applejack." Pictured (left to right): Matt Gormann, Katherine Simpson, Eleanor Horsburgh, Julie Conway, Robert Simpson.

The Triangles are an indie pop band from Melbourne, Australia.

Eleanor Horsburgh, Julie Conway, Katherine Simpson (née James), Matt Gormann and Robert Simpson met as school friends in Boronia, a suburb of Melbourne. They began playing together in 2003 and collaborated on writing songs that mixed elements of rock, psych-pop and folk. They performed in local venues and self-released two song collections before signing with local label Half a Cow Records. Through Half a Cow they released the CDs Magic Johnson (2005) and Seventy-Five Year Plan (2007). Magic Johnson spawned the regional hit singles "Applejack" and "Let's Replace the Cityscapes."

The Triangles ostensibly split after the release of their second CD when several members left Australia. The band reformed early in 2010 when they were approached to perform "Applejack" in a Spanish TV commercial for Estrella Damm. Consequently, the tune became a hit single in Spain during the summer of 2010, reaching No. 1 on the Spanish iTunes singles chart, as well as spending 14 weeks on the CD singles chart, peaking at No. 8. The commercial has been viewed on YouTube over eight million times as of 2024, and led to the posting of numerous home-grown "Applejack" music videos by Spanish fans. An album of previously released Triangles songs was released in July 2010 by Universal Music Spain. "Applejack" is also featured in Jetstar Airways advertising, and in 2013 for the LG G2 smartphone ad in Europe and the U.S.

The Triangles reactivated in late 2010 with new music in the form of an EP entitled The Night Lunch, released independently in 2011.

On 19 November 2013, World of Rock Records announced the release of "Applejack" as a limited edition, yellow seven-inch vinyl single, with "Let's Replace The Cityscapes" serving as the B-side. It was scheduled to be released in 2014. A commercial for the single was released by World of Rock Records on 19 December 2013.

As of 2017, Katherine and Robert Simpson perform and record as the duo Blooming Heck.

The linguistics podcast Lingthusiasm, hosted by Gretchen McCulloch and Lauren Gawne, uses The Triangles' song "Ancient City" for the podcast's intro and outro music.

== Members ==
- Julie Conway – keyboards, accordion
- Matt Gormann – guitars, vocals, ukulele, banjo, harmonica
- Eleanor Horsburgh – vocals, drums, percussion, melodica, glockenspiel
- Katherine Simpson – bass guitar, vocals, recorder, ukulele, kazoo
- Robert Simpson – drums, guitars, synthesizer

== Discography ==
=== Albums ===
- Waterfive (2003) independent
- Red Panda (2004) independent
- Magic Johnson (2005; reissued 2010) Half a Cow Records HAC117
- Seventy-Five Year Plan (2007) Half a Cow Records HAC125
- The Triangles (2010) Universal Music Spain
- A Tray of Cards: Best of And Unreleased Favourites (2017) Half a Cow Records HAC187D (digital only)
- Blooming Heck (Katherine Simpson and Robert Simpson; 2017) Half a Cow Records HAC190

=== Singles/EPs ===
- "Let's Replace the Cityscapes"/“Punctured Lungs” (2003) Half a Cow PROMOO36
- The Feast of Stephen (2003)
- Christmas 2005 (2005) Half a Cow YULEDO001
- "I've Had Eyes for You" (2006)
- "Applejack"/“Let’s Replace the Cityscapes” (2010) Half a Cow PROMOO65
- The Night Lunch EP (2011)
- "Applejack" b/w "Let's Replace the Cityscapes" (2014) World of Rock Records
