= The Elements of Eloquence =

2013 book by Mark Forsyth

The Elements of Eloquence: How to Turn the Perfect English Phrase
- First edition
- Author: Mark Forsyth
- Language: English
- Subject: Rhetoric
- Published: 2013
- Publisher: Icon Books
- Publication place: UK
- Pages: 224
- ISBN: 9781848316218

The Elements of Eloquence: How to Turn the Perfect English Phrase is a non-fiction book by Mark Forsyth published in 2013. The book explains classical rhetoric, dedicating each chapter to a rhetorical figure with examples of its use, particularly in the works of William Shakespeare. Forsyth argues the power and memorability of language is a result of deliberate, formal rhetoric, and highlights its use via providing examples from a variety of classical, biblical, and contemporary writers.

== Chapters ==
=== 1: Alliteration ===
Repeating the sound of the first consonant in a series of words. An example of its deliberate overuse given by Forsyth is:

Whereat, with blade, with bloody blameful blade,
He bravely broached his boiling bloody breast;

— William Shakespeare, A Midsummer Night's Dream

=== 2: Polyptoton ===
Forsyth defines this as the "use of one word as different parts of speech or in different grammatical forms". The term applies wherever words derived from the same root (e.g. wretched and wretchedness) are used. Other sources use the related term antanaclasis when the same word is repeated in a different sense.

Grace me no grace, nor uncle me no uncle:
I am no traitor's uncle; and that word 'grace'
In an ungracious mouth is but profane.

— William Shakespeare, Richard II

=== 3: Antithesis ===
The use of opposites for contrasting effect. The example quoted by Forsyth is:

It was the best of times, it was the worst of times.

— Charles Dickens, A Tale of Two Cities

=== 4: Merism ===
Reference to one thing by an enumeration of its parts, or by a list of synonyms. The chapter focuses on the first definition and provides the following example:

Cannon to right of them,
Cannon to left of them,
Cannon in front of them

— Alfred, Lord Tennyson, The Charge of the Light Brigade

=== 5: Blazon ===
The tradition in poetry of praising a woman by using metaphors to describe distinct parts of her body. Calling this "extended merism, the dismemberment of the loved one", Forsyth quotes:

Her yellow locks exceed the beaten gold;
Her sparkling eyes in heav'n a place deserve;
Her forehead high and fair of comely mold

— Thomas Watson, Hekatompathia

=== 6: Synaesthesia ===
Where one sense is described in terms of another. An example given by Forsyth is Eduard Hanslick's criticism of Tchaikovsky's Violin Concerto as "music that stinks to the ear".

=== 7: Aposiopesis ===
When a sentence is deliberately left unfinished, with the ending to be supplied by the audience's imagination. This makes an impression of unwillingness or inability to continue. Forsyth gives as an example:

I will have such revenges on you both,
that the world shall ... I will do such things...
What they are, yet I know not: but they shall be
the terrors of the earth.

— William Shakespeare, King Lear

=== 8: Hyperbaton ===
Changing the logical order of words in a sentence. As an example, Forsyth cites Richard Lovelace's line, "Stone walls do not a prison make" when the more natural wording would be "Stone walls do not make a prison", adding that in any case the statement is "factually incorrect".

=== 9: Anadiplosis ===
Repetition of the last word of a preceding clause. Forsyth give this example:

We glory in tribulations also, knowing that tribulation worketh patience, and patience, experience, and experience, hope, and hope maketh man not ashamed

— Paul the Apostle, Epistle to the Romans

=== 10: Periodic Sentences ===
A sentence that is not complete grammatically before the final clause or phrase, such as Rudyard Kipling's poem If—

=== 11: Hypotaxis and Parataxis ===
Forsyth contrasts hypotaxis, as a complex style of writing using many subordinate clauses, with parataxis, a style of writing in short, simple sentences.

=== 12: Diacope ===
The close repetition of a word or phrase, separated by a word or words. Forsyth says the line "Bond, James Bond" is memorable only because of diacope, writing,: "So just to recap, one of the greatest lines in the history of cinema is a man saying a name deliberately designed to be dull. The only possible explanation for the line's popularity is the way it is phrased. ... Wording, pure wording".

=== 13: Rhetorical Questions ===
As described by Forsyth, who admits "how complicated this all is", rhetorical questions can be mainly divided into:

- Questions that asked but for which no answer is expected, such as:

Shall I compare thee to a summer's day?

— William Shakespeare, Sonnet 18

and

And did those feet in ancient time
Walk upon England's mountains green?

— William Blake, And did those feet in ancient time

- Questions that have a purpose but no real answer, such as "What's the point? Why go on?"
- Questions that are asked which a particular audience will answer in a particular way, such as "Which party cares about what is best for Britain?" when asked by the leader of a political party at a rally of their own supporters. However, Forsyth notes the overwhelming exception when this device is used in Monty Python's Life of Brian.
- Questions that are asked aloud and then immediately answered by the questioner: "You ask, what is our aim? I can answer in one word: Victory!" (Winston Churchill, We shall fight on the beaches)
- Questions that are asked to which both the questioner and the person asked know the answer, such as a traffic policeman asking a speeding motorist, "Did you think the speed limit didn’t apply to you?"

=== 14: Hendiadys ===
For emphasis an adjective-noun form is replaced by a noun-and-noun form. As an example, Forsyth writes, "So instead of saying 'I'm going to the noisy city' you say 'I'm going to the noise and the city'".

=== 15: Epistrophe ===
Repetition of a word or words at the end of successive phrases, clauses or sentences for emphasis. Forsyth quotes:

Wherever there's a fight so hungry people can eat, I'll be there. Wherever there's a cop beating up a guy, I'll be there. […] And when our folk eat the stuff they raise and live in the houses they build – why, I'll be there.

— John Steinbeck, The Grapes of Wrath

=== 16: Tricolon ===
A sentence composed of three equal parts. Forsyth cites France's motto (Liberté, égalité, fraternité).

=== 17: Epizeuxis ===
Repetition of a word or phrase for emphasis. For example:

The first rule of Fight Club is: you do not talk about Fight Club. The second rule of Fight Club is: you do not talk about Fight Club.

— Chuck Palahniuk, Fight Club

=== 18: Syllepsis ===
Where a word, used with two other parts of a sentence, must be understood differently in relation to each.

=== 19: Isocolon ===
A sentence is composed of two parts equivalent in structure, length and rhythm. Other sources suggest at least two equivalent parts.

=== 20: Enallage ===
A deliberate grammatical mistake.

Example: "Mistah Kurtz—he dead" from Joseph Conrad's Heart of Darkness.

=== 21: Versification ===
Forsyth discusses the effect of different verse forms.

=== 22: Zeugma ===
A series of clauses using the same verb.

=== 23: Paradox ===
A logically false or impossible statement, for emphasis or contrast.

=== 24: Chiasmus ===
The symmetrical repetition of structure or wording.

Example: "Let us never negotiate out of fear, but let us never fear to negotiate." - John F. Kennedy.

=== 25: Assonance ===
The repetition of a vowel sound.

=== 26: The Fourteenth Rule ===
Providing an unnecessarily specific number for something for emphasis.

=== 27: Catachresis ===
The grammatically incorrect use of words for creative expression.

Example: Hamlet saying "I will speak daggers"—a catachresis since one cannot literally "speak a dagger".

=== 28: Litotes ===
Emphasizing a point by denying the opposite.

=== 29: Metonymy and Synecdoche ===
Using something connected to the thing described, or a part of it, in place of the thing itself.

=== 30: Transferred Epithets ===
Applying an adjective to the wrong noun, for effect.

=== 31: Pleonasm ===
Using superfluous or unnecessary words for emphasis.

=== 32: Epanalepsis ===
Repetition of a word or phrase at the beginning and end of a sentence or clause to emphasize circularity.

=== 33: Personification ===
Ascribing human actions or qualities to a non-human thing.

=== 34: Hyperbole ===
Exaggeration.

=== 35: Adynaton ===
Hyperbole so extreme that it is completely impossible.

=== 36: Prolepsis ===
Using a pronoun at the start of a sentence, which reverses the normal order.

=== 37: Congeries ===
A bewildering list of adjectives or nouns.

=== 38: Scesis Onomaton ===
Sentences without a main verb.

=== 39: Anaphora ===
Starting each sentence with the same words.

== Critical reception ==
David Evans, in The Independent, called it an "enjoyable, accessible book". Christopher Howse in The Spectator described the author as "well informed and amusing". Howse also criticised several mistakes and wrongly attributed quotes, hoping "the publishers, having let those through, will mend them in the many future printings the book deserves" . The Wall Street Journal review said Forsyth is "adept at adding spice to received wisdom and popularizing the findings of academic linguists" and emphasizes that "potent rhetorical devices are all around us".
