= Adam Aleksic =

American content creator (born 2001)

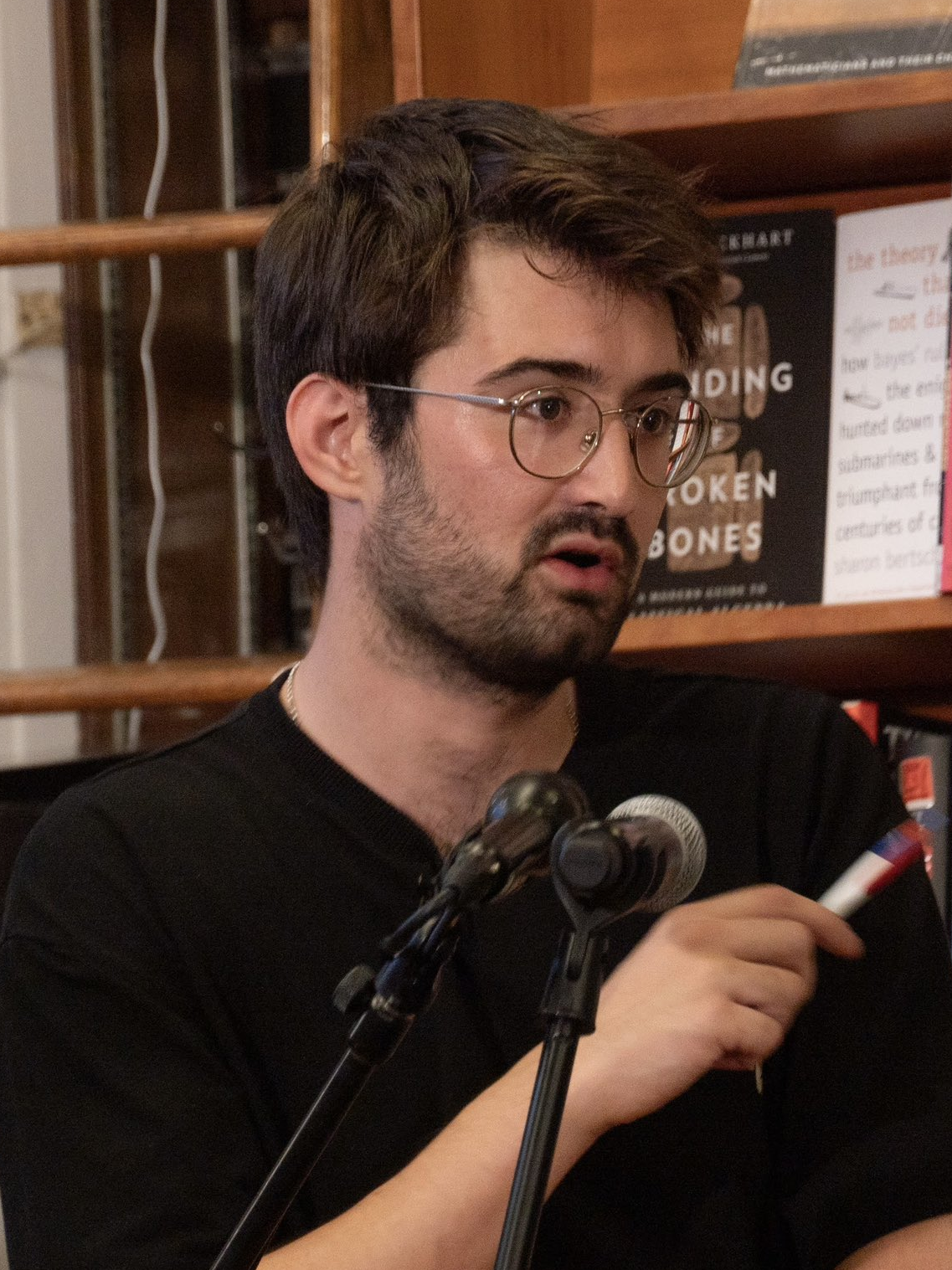
- Aleksic in 2025
- Born: January 3, 2001 (age 25)
- Education: Harvard University (BA)
- Occupations: Linguist; content creator; writer
- Years active: 2016–present
- Notable work: Algospeak

Instagram information
- Page: Adam Aleksic
- Years active: 2018–present
- Genres: Linguistics; education; infographic
- Followers: 1.7M

Substack information
- Newsletter: The Etymology Nerd
- Topics: Linguistics; education
- Subscribers: 105K (October 2026)

TikTok information
- Page: etymologynerd
- Years active: 2023–present
- Genres: Linguistics; education
- Followers: 918K

YouTube information
- Channel: Etymology Nerd
- Years active: 2023–present
- Genres: Linguistics; education
- Subscribers: 734K
- Views: 623M
- Adam Aleksic's voice Adam Aleksic on the perception of vertical short-form content Recorded June 19, 2025
- Website: etymologynerd.com

Adam Viktor Aleksic (/ə.ˈlɛk.sɪk/, ə-LEK-sik; born January 3, 2001), known online as Etymology Nerd, is an American content creator and linguist who produces videos exploring the origins of words, particularly neologisms and slang as it exists within digital culture. He began exploring word origins in 2016 through his blog. Aleksic studied at Harvard College, during which he gained attention for his educational TikTok videos on linguistics and language in 2023. In 2025, he published Algospeak: How Social Media Is Transforming the Future of Language.

== Early life and education ==
Aleksic grew up in Albany, New York. His parents were atmospheric scientists who worked at the New York State Department of Environmental Conservation. His mother studied air pollution, while his father was a cloud physics expert. His parents immigrated to the United States from Serbia in the 1990s.

He discovered etymology during a visit to a bookstore in Cambridge, England in March 2016 while reading the 2011 publication The Etymologicon by English author Mark Forsyth. He stated that it fascinated him, calling it "the perfect bridge between history and language, two previous interests of mine." From 2017 to 2019, Aleksic received awards in essay competitions organized by the Albany-Tula Alliance, getting third place in 2017, first place in 2018, and again third place in 2019. During his second year, he established the Geography Bee at Albany High School to raise geographical awareness within the school.

In his book Algospeak, Aleksic recounts how as a teenager he became one of the top 80 users on Reddit, learning to manipulate social media algorithms.

While at Harvard, Aleksic was involved in writing, acting, and directing for the Kirkland Drama Society, served as the social chair for both the Harvard quiz bowl team and the Science Fiction Association, and established the Harvard Undergraduate Linguistics Society. During the COVID-19 pandemic, he started "Week Week" in the Kirkland House with his friends, promoting creative methods to bring residents together. For his efforts, he received the Aloian Memorial Scholarship in 2022. Aleksic later mentioned that he helped create the "Choosening" ceremony, where a new theme is chosen at the beginning of each week. He described it as a cult that was "surprisingly easy" to initiate.

He received his BA from Harvard University in 2023, with the thesis The Effects of Language Policy on Language Identity in Serbia and Croatia.

== Social media career ==
In November 2016, Aleksic started the blog Etymology Nerd, where he produced infographics focused on the etymology of various items and geographic locations. He started his geographic locations series after having curiosity about the origin of the Manhattan neighborhood Hell's Kitchen, which led him to create infographics for neighborhood names in other American cities.

In 2023, during his final semester at Harvard, Aleksic started posting linguistics videos on TikTok after a friend suggested the idea. In an interview with The New York Times, he said that each video takes him four to five hours to make, writing a full script and searching Google Scholar for academic papers to include as screenshots. Several of his videos have gone viral, including ones where he created languages based on animal sounds, explained the origins of Western surnames through comparison with phone contact names, and addressed misconceptions about the "gay accent."

He has published articles on language and online culture in the Washington Post, Financial Times, and elsewhere.

=== Algospeak ===
In January 2024, Aleksic began writing a book to explore social media linguistics in depth. On July 15, 2025, Aleksic published the book Algospeak: How Social Media Is Transforming the Future of Language, which explores how language has changed because of TikTok and social media algorithms. The book was featured in Our Culture Mag's Most Anticipated Books of Summer 2025. Algospeak covers in-groups and out-groups, censorship, language appropriation, online extremism, microtrends, clickbait, and generational differences.

The book was well-received by several reviewers. Sadie Dingfelder of The Washington Post said Aleksic represents "the very linguistic shifts he describes" and called the book "valuable" for the way he explains linguistics. Amy Scribner of BookPage described it as "a fun, illuminating read," but also noted that some parts were "a bummer" because they looked at radicalization and harmful ideas online. Publishers Weekly called it "an energetic and eye-opening study" of how language is used on social media. Rachel S. Hunt of the Associated Press called the book a "sobering reality check on how social media is affecting not just our speech, but our entire identities."

== Personal life ==
Aleksic resides in Manhattan, New York City. He has also lived in Barcelona, Spain.

In 2021, Aleksic created an online petition to change the flag of Albany, saying that the flag was poorly designed by vexillology standards and was also linked to the Dutch Nazi Party and other white supremacist organizations. Albany council member Owusu Anane submitted a resolution based on this petition.
