= Because Internet =

2019 linguistics book by Gretchen McCulloch

Because Internet: Understanding the New Rules of Language
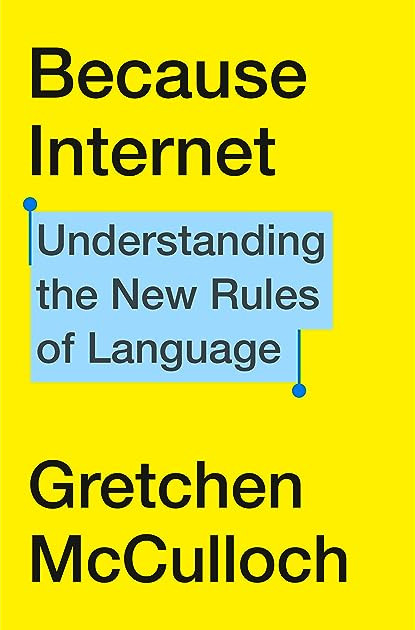
- Author: Gretchen McCulloch
- Subject: Linguistics of online communication
- Published: 2019
- Publisher: Riverhead Books

Because Internet: Understanding the New Rules of Language is a 2019 book by linguist Gretchen McCulloch about the linguistics of online communication.

== Release ==
Because Internet describes emergent patterns in language use on the internet. McCulloch frequently discusses the offline precedents of online language patterns. She told The Guardian, "I had a feeling that people tend to sort of exoticise the internet and think of it as a place where all of the old rules don't apply, but in many respects people are still people, and we still bring ourselves and our cultures with us when we go on the internet."

Because of the large volume of public informal writing that is online, linguistics researchers can analyze day-to-day communication of the 21st century more easily than previous writing, which required transcription.

She also discusses specific phrases, words, and punctuation, including the "sarcasm tilde" and "expressive lengthening" (noooo). The acronym LOL has changed since it emerged in the 1980s, possibly coined by a Canadian man named Wayne Pearson. McCulloch writes that LOL no longer conveys physical laughter but instead indicates irony or goodwill. She cites research from linguist Michelle McSweeney, who analyzed text messages and concluded that "lol" indicates a new layer of meaning. It allows plausible deniability, and McCulloch uses the example "you look good in red lol." Periods at the end of text messages feel passive-aggressive because they introduce formality into a typically informal context. McCulloch observes that keysmash, which tends to contain home row letters like "asdfjklasjgd;lkafdj" when written on a computer, contains different letters when written on smartphone. Additionally, spell checkers have entrenched the British English and American English difference in -ise endings, like publicize and romanticize. McCulloch writes that some internet slang predates the internet. Starting in 1975, early programmers maintained a digital file of "hacker slang" called the Jargon File. As early as 1976, the Jargon File contained computer slang including "feature," "bug," and "glitch." In 1977, social terms entered the file including still-common abbreviations like "BTW" and "FYI." McCulloch suggests that elderly people use ellipsis because they were a space-saving thought separator appropriate for paper communication, where line breaks wasted space. She writes that emoji convey the same information in digital communication that gesturing conveys in spoken conversation.

== Reception ==
The reception of the book were positive. Critic Jennifer Szalai wrote in The New York Times that, "McCulloch is such a disarming writer — lucid, friendly, unequivocally excited about her subject — that I began to marvel at the flexibility of the online language she describes, with its numerous shades of subtlety".

== See also ==
- Algospeak (book)
