= Hypotaxis =

Concept in linguistics

Martin Luther King Jr. wrote "Letter from Birmingham Jail" which used hypotaxis to prove the merit of the civil rights movement.

Hypotaxis is the grammatical arrangement of functionally similar but "unequal" constructs (from Greek hypo- "beneath", and taxis "arrangement"); certain constructs have more importance than others inside a sentence. Its antonym is parataxis.

Hypotactic constructions in complex sentence are often made using subordinating conjunctions and relative pronouns that connect dependent clauses to the independent clause.

Hypotaxis may also stem from premodification: in the phrase "inexpensive composite materials", "composite" modifies "materials" while "inexpensive" modifies the complex head "composite materials", rather than "composite" or "materials". In this example the phrase units are hierarchically structured, rather than being at the same level, as compared with the example "Cockroaches love warm, damp, dark places." The key difference in how they are written is that premodification doesn't have a comma between the modifiers.

== Rhetorical use ==
While parataxis is typically built with simple sentences that supplies a sense of order or chronology, the relation of the events described is often diminished acting as the juxtaposition of events and ideas. Hypotactic constructions rely more heavily on complex sentence structures that allow for the clear adoption of a position.

Parataxis— the antithesis of hypotaxis, instead involving short (and often simple) sentences bereft of subordinating conjunctions— is, according to Forsyth, the natural way of speaking English. Hypotaxis, contrastingly, is unnatural and arises from premeditated sentence construction. "An angry drunk might shout paratactically," Forsyth argues; "only a just and gentle mind can be hypotactic." Hypotaxis, therefore, has the effect of formalizing and legitimizing arguments and other prose that may sound extemporaneous or ill-considered written paratactically.

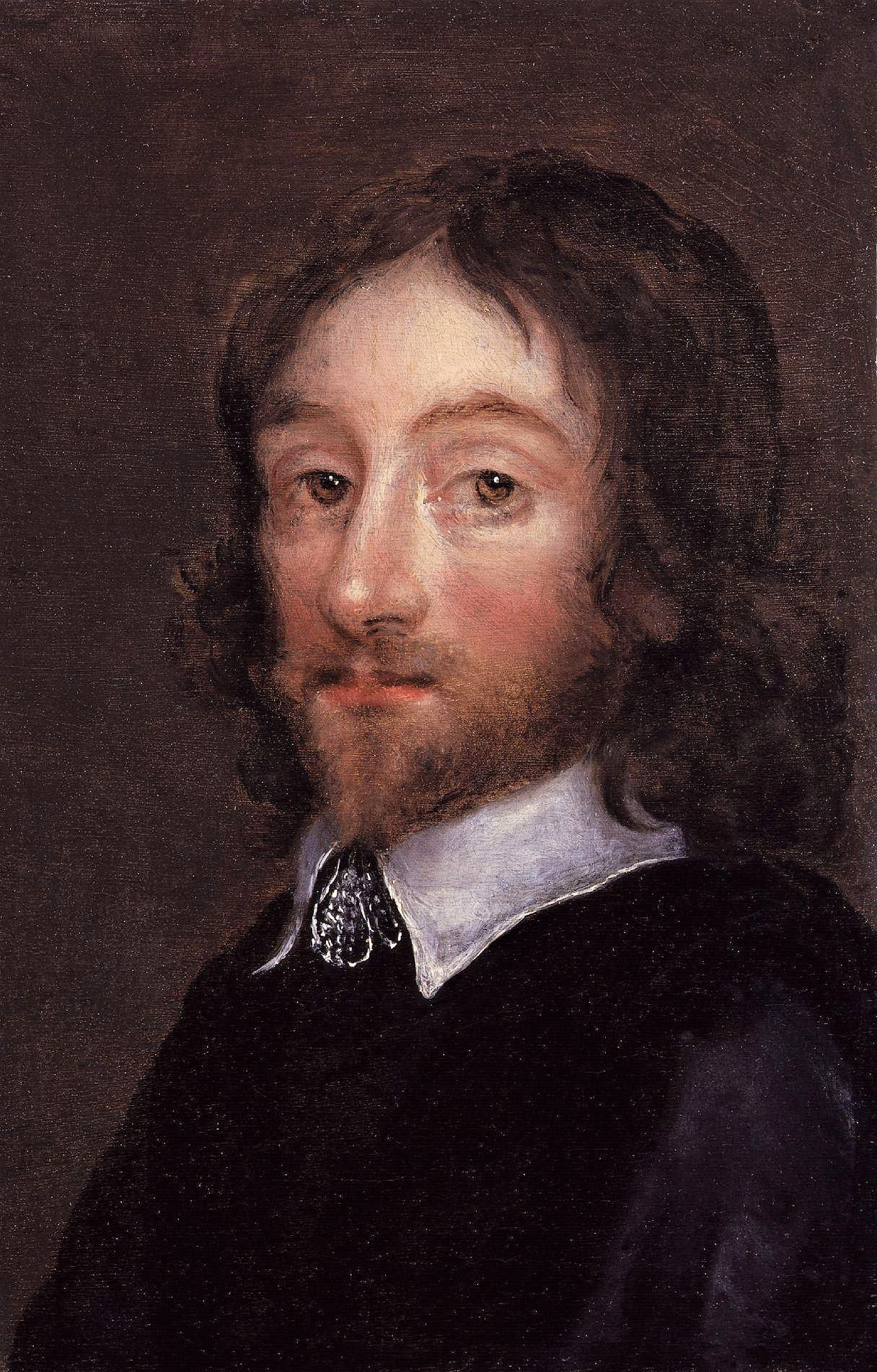
Sir Thomas Browne, a writer of hypotactical prose

Complex understanding of grammatical constructions can convey to the reader the author's understanding of the prose's subject, whether their knowledgeability is genuine or not. For example, the hypotaxis in Martin Luther King Jr.'s "Letter from Birmingham Jail" helped legitimize his judgement and understanding of the political climate in Birmingham and the South as a whole, which was called into doubt by his critics.

17th-century prose-writer Thomas Browne— according to Mark Forsyth— is the best candidate for originating the use of hypotaxis in the English language (as well as the first writer to write prose for its own sake) due to his use of complex sentence structure.

== Examples ==
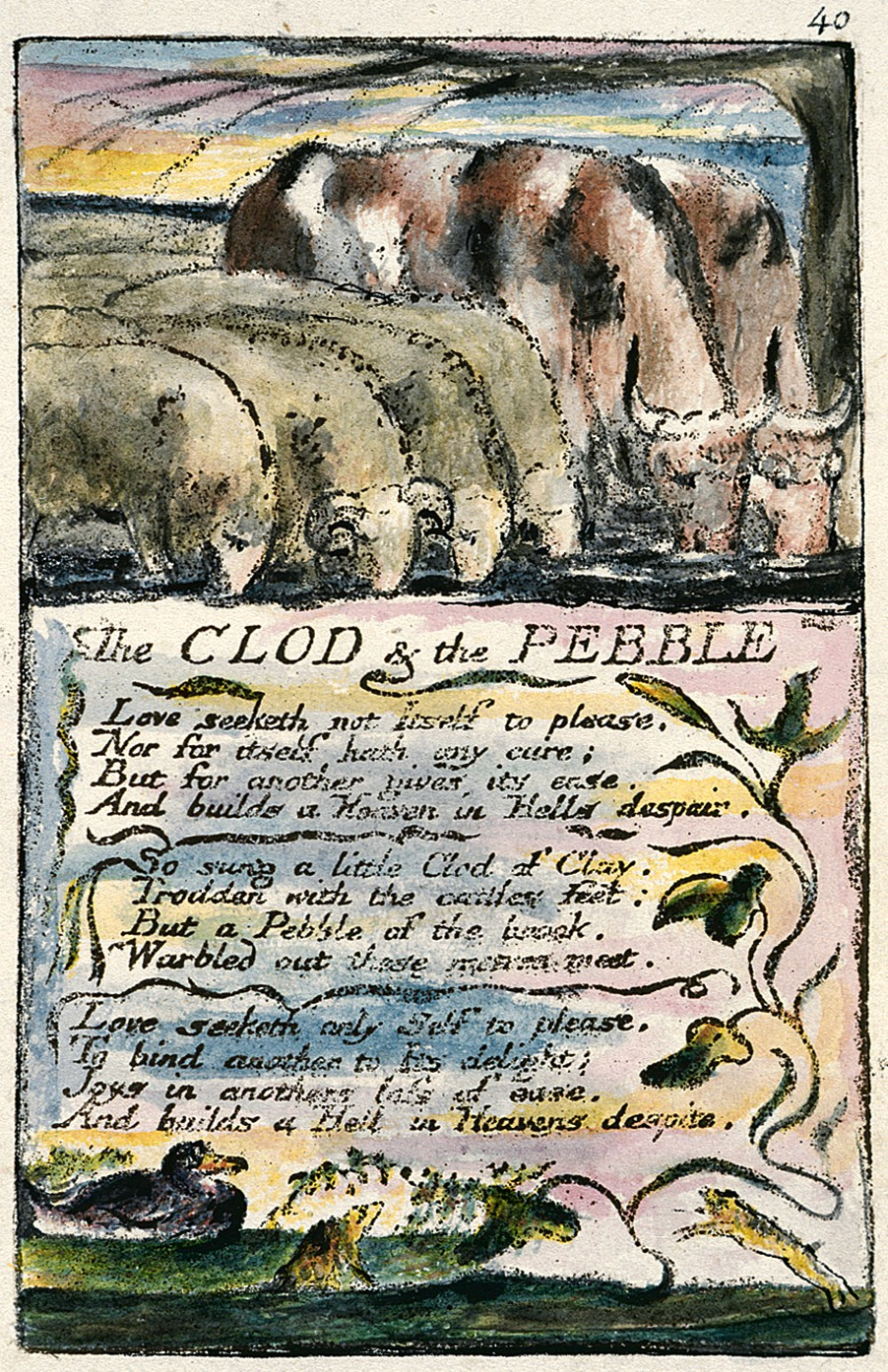
"The Clod and the Pebble" by William Blake which features some hypotaxis

The second stanza of John Keats's "Ode to a Nightingale" reads: "O, for a draught of vintage! That hath been/ Cool'd a long age in the deep-delved earth, / Tasting of Flora and the country green" (1. 11–13). The "draught of vintage" is modified, via the relative pronoun "that," by the clauses in the successive lines.

In "The Clod and the Pebble" by William Blake, the phrase "So sang a little Clod of Clay,/ Trodden with the cattle's feet" (l. 5–6) displays hypotaxis via the modification of the fifth line's "Clod of Clay" in the next line.

In The Rambler, Samuel Johnson hypotactically writes: "Among the innumerable practices by which interest or envy have taught those who live upon literary fame to disturb each other at their airy banquets, one of the most common is the charge of plagiarism. When the excellence of a new composition can no longer be contested, and malice is compelled to give way to the unanimity of applause, there is yet this one expedient to be tried, by which the author may be degraded, though his work be reverenced; and the excellence which we cannot obscure, may be set at such a distance as not to overpower our fainter lustre. This accusation is dangerous, because, even when it is false, it may be sometimes urged with probability."
