= My Weekend as a 28-Year-Old in Chicago =

2022 satirical viral video

- Written by: Mike Schwanke
- Narrated by: Mike Schwanke
- Release date: August 29, 2022
- Running time: 2 minutes and 15 seconds
- Country: United States

My Weekend as a 28-Year-Old in Chicago is a satirical video created by American comedian Mike Schwanke, under the pseudonym Judd Crud. It was published on August 29, 2022, on TikTok, Twitter, and Instagram. A parody of "day in the life" vlogs, the video walks through the events of an imagined weekend of Schwanke's life in Chicago, Illinois, growing increasingly unrealistic as the video progresses.

The video quickly achieved viral status, amassing over 6.5 million views on Twitter within two days of its release. It was met with widespread acclaim from critics, with some calling it one of the greatest TikTok videos of all time.

== Background and production ==
Mike Schwanke, known online as Judd Crud, grew up in Appleton, Wisconsin, and cofounded the absurdist horror sketch comedy troupe Phantasmagoria while living in Denver. In spring 2022, Schwanke moved to Chicago with two other members of the troupe, which they renamed Crud, and continued making videos to entertain their friends back in Denver.

Schwanke posted My Weekend as a 28-Year-Old in Chicago on various social media platforms on August 29, 2022. The video's script was written by Schwanke, but its video clips are largely spliced together from others' videos that he found on TikTok, excluding clips of Schwanke making his bed, walking his dog, making a sandwich, and going to Target. During the actual weekend, according to Schwanke, "I'd just moved to Chicago and my girlfriend and roommate were both out of town", and "I didn't do anything."

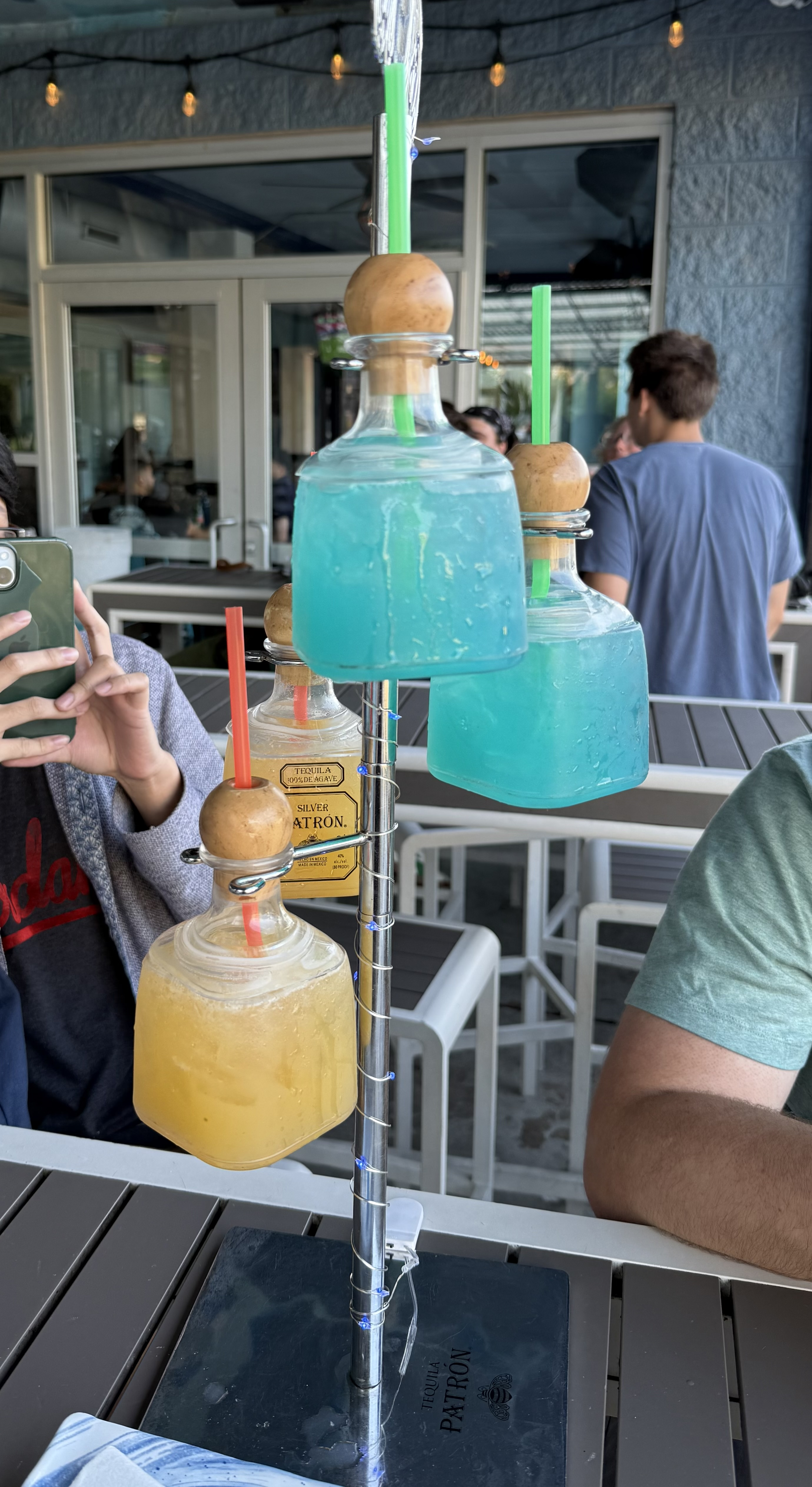
A margarita tower

The video depicts a spiraling quantity of activities over the course of the weekend, including six "margarita towers", several visits to the Museum of Ice Cream, and various activities with the narrator's wife, husband, and girlfriend. It is a parody of the "day in the life" vlog genre, which exploded in popularity on Instagram and TikTok as early as 2020. Among the earliest viral "day in the life" videos was Weekend in the life of a 26 year old in NYC by influencer Codey James, which inspired the title of Schwanke's video and similarly begins with a mental health day at the narrator's company. Schwanke explained in an interview with The Daily Dot: "I don't usually do parodies like that, but I was surprised that I hadn't seen a decent one yet. I think those videos are already kind of parodies of themselves because some of these people are living kind of insane lives to begin with."

Schwanke mimicked the so-called "TikTok voice" in the video, commenting to BuzzFeed News, "It's like people are turning into robots trying to sound more human on TikTok because TikTok is kind of an insane platform."

== Reception ==
My Weekend as a 28-Year-Old in Chicago has received widespread acclaim from critics. Vox culture writer Rebecca Jennings called the video "one of the best TikToks ever created", describing it as an "expensive caricature of a certain kind of hypersocial, hyper-consumerist urban 20-something" and noting, "It took me until his second visit to the Museum of Ice Cream ... to realize that it was all a joke." The New Yorker writer Tyler Foggatt dubbed the video a "TikTok masterpiece" that "spirals out of control" in its two-minute runtime. Defector Media editor-in-chief Tom Ley shared the video to the site, commenting, "The simple fact is that I have been laughing at it for two days."

Writing for The Guardian, film critic Alison Willmore included the video in a list titled "The 10 funniest things I have ever seen (on the internet)", writing, "This is close enough to the kind of numbing urbanite consumption videos being poked fun of that it's not until he's mentioned going out to eat four times in less than a day that you realize something else is going on." In a review for Bon Appétit, Nico Avalle wrote, "The best thing about this video is that it took me a minute to realize it's a parody", adding that "the funniest part is the spot-on cadence." David Mack of BuzzFeed News called the video a "pitch-perfect parody", describing it as "the TikTok equivalent of semantic satiation".

In a review for Mubi Notebook, Dylan Adamson analyzed the video's contents, enumerating its 142 cuts in 135 seconds, 27 different people, and 19 different restaurants and bars, concluding that "the satire of My Weekend as a 28-Year-Old in Chicago is subtle, a dimly dawning impression rather than the onslaught suggested by these eye-popping formal and content statistics."

== See also ==
- Cultural impact of TikTok
- TikTok food trends
