= Constance Hale =

American writer and critic

- Born: Constance Hale; Waialua, Hawaii, United States
- Occupations: Author, Journalist
- Website: sinandsyntax.com

Constance Hale is an American writer and critic based in San Francisco. Her journalism has appeared in metropolitan newspapers and national magazines, but she is best known for her books on language: Sin and Syntax; Vex, Hex, Smash, Smooch; and Wired Style. She teaches writing and editing at Harvard University and the University of California at Berkeley.

== Personal life ==
Constance Hale was born and grew up on the North Shore of Oʻahu, where she spoke English at home and Hawaiian Pidgin (or “Hawaiʻi Creole English”) at school and with friends. She attributes her initial fascination with language to this “bilingual upbringing.” She left Hawaii to pursue a bachelor's degree in English literature from Princeton University and a master’s in Journalism from the University of California at Berkeley. She is married to Bruce Lowell Bigelow. Hale retains close ties to Hawaii both personally and professionally.

== Career ==
After graduating from Princeton, Hale spent a number of years writing fiction and drama and performing her own solo pieces in San Francisco. She completed her master's degree from the Graduate School of Journalism at the University of California at Berkeley, then worked as a reporter and editor at the Gilroy Dispatch, the Oakland Tribune, and the San Francisco Examiner, before taking a position as copy chief at Wired magazine. That led to the publication of Wired Style: Principles of English Usage in the Digital Age, in 1996, and later to Sin and Syntax: How to Craft Wickedly Effective Prose, in 1999, and "Vex, Hex, Smash, Smooch: Let Verbs Power Your Writing," in 2012. She has been dubbed “Marion the Librarian on a Harley or E.B. White on acid.”

Hale has written about Latin plurals and Latino culture, Berkeley politics and Hawaiian sovereignty. Her journalism has appeared in The Atlantic Monthly, Health, Honolulu, National Geographic Adventure, Smithsonian, Writer’s Digest and The Writer, among other magazines. Her travel essays have appeared in the Los Angeles Times, the Dallas Morning News, Miami Herald, the San Francisco Chronicle, Via, Afar, and numerous anthologies.

Currently Hale teaches writing and journalism at Harvard University Extension School and U.C. Berkeley Extension, as well as at the San Francisco Writers' Grotto. In 2008 and 2009, she chaired the Nieman Conference on Narrative Journalism in Boston, Massachusetts. She speaks at writing conferences all over the country and gives workshops in both newsrooms and boardrooms.

Hale also works as a freelance editor for Harvard Business School Press and various private clients. She is a founder of The Prose Doctors, an editors’ collective, and a member of The San Francisco Writers' Grotto.

== Bibliography ==
- The Natives Are Restless (2016)
- Vex, Hex, Smash, Smooch: Let Verbs Power Your Writing (2012)
- Sin and Syntax: How to Craft Wickedly Effective Prose (2001)
- Wired Style: Principles of English Usage in the Digital Age (1996)
- “How Do You Say Computer in Hawaiian?” in "Cultural Diversity Supplement No.1"
- “The Saints and Spectres of the Alpilles,” in Provence
- “Souvenirs,” in A Woman’s Europe
- “Cutouts,” in Italy, A Love Story and Best Travel Writing 2006
