= Algospeak =

Obfuscated speech on social media

On social media, algospeak is a self-censorship phenomenon in which users adopt coded expressions to evade real or imagined automated content moderation. It allows users to discuss topics deemed sensitive to moderation algorithms while avoiding penalties such as shadow banning, downranking, or de-monetization of content. A type of netspeak, algospeak primarily serves to bypass censorship, though it can also reinforce group belonging, especially in marginalized communities. Algospeak has been identified as one source of linguistic change in the modern era, with some terms spreading into everyday offline speech and writing. The term has been used more broadly to include any language change driven by digital usage.

== History ==
The term algospeak—a blend of Algorithm and ‑speak—appears to date back to 2021, though related ideas have existed for longer. In 2018, the internet researcher Emily van der Nagel coined the terms Voldemorting and screenshotting, two strategies social media users use to avoid giving attention to objectionable figures or attracting algorithmic attention from unwanted audiences. "Voldemorting" is named after Harry Potter character Lord Voldemort, aka "You-Know-Who" or "He-Who-Must-Not-Be-Named", and involves obfuscating the referent of a post by avoiding directly mentioning a name or a term. Screenshotting refers to the act of sharing screenshots instead of machine-readable text.

The term algospeak gained wider recognition in 2022 after Taylor Lorenz featured it in an article for The Washington Post. In 2025, Adam Aleksic published Algospeak, the first monograph dedicated to the phenomenon. It proposes an expanded definition which encompasses any language change that is primarily driven by the constraints of digital platforms.

== Causes and motivations ==
Many social media platforms rely on automated content moderation systems to enforce their guidelines, which the users often have no control over and may be changed at any time. TikTok in particular uses artificial intelligence to proactively moderate content, in addition to responding to user reports and using human moderators. In colloquial usage, such systems are called "algorithms" or "bots". TikTok has faced criticism for its unequal enforcement on topics such as LGBTQ people and obesity, leading to a perception that social media moderation is contradictory and inconsistent.

Between July and September 2024, TikTok reported removing 150 million videos, 120 million of which were flagged by automated systems. Automated moderation may miss important context; for example, benign communities who aid people who struggle with self-harm, suicidal thoughts, or past sexual violence may inadvertently receive unwarranted penalties. TikTok users have used algospeak to discuss and provide support to those who self-harm. An interview with nineteen TikTok creators revealed that they felt TikTok's moderation lacked contextual understanding, appeared random, was often inaccurate, and exhibited bias against marginalized communities.

Algospeak is also used in communities promoting harmful behaviors. Anti-vaccination Facebook groups began renaming themselves to "dance party" or "dinner party" to avoid being flagged for misinformation. Likewise, communities that encourage the eating disorder anorexia nervosa have been employing algospeak. Euphemisms like "cheese pizza" are used to refer to child pornography.

On TikTok, moderation decisions can result in consequences such as account bans and deletion or delisting of videos from the main video discovery page, called the "For You" page. In response, a TikTok spokeswoman told The New York Times that the users' fears are misplaced, saying that many popular videos discuss sex-adjacent topics.

== Methods ==
Algospeak uses techniques akin to those used in Aesopian language to conceal the intended meaning from automated content filters, while being understandable to human readers. Other similar adoption of obfuscated speech include Cockney rhyming slang and Polari, which historically were used by London gangs and British gay men. However, unlike other forms of obfuscated speech, the global reach of social media has allowed the language to spread beyond local settings.

Techniques used in algospeak are extremely diverse. In orthography, users may draw from leetspeak, where letters are replaced with lookalike characters (e.g. $3X for sex). Certain words or names may be censored, or in the case of auditory media, cut off or bleeped, (Note: Bleep censor is commonly implemented in the editing process of TV production, mostly for censoring out obscene language, rather than by YouTube and TikTok video authors themselves.) e.g., s*icide instead of suicide. Another method involves "pseudo-substitution", where an item is censored in one form, while it is present in another form at the same time, as seen in videos. Some may involve intersemiotic translation, where non-linguistic signs are interpreted linguistically, in addition to further obfuscation. For example, the corn emoji "🌽" may signify pornography by means of porn → corn → 🌽. Others may rely on phonological similarity or variation, such as homophobic → hydrophobic, and sexy → seggsy via intervocalic voicing. On Chinese social media, users sometimes replace sensitive terms with characters that differ only in tone. For example, 细颈瓶 (xì jǐng píng, literally "narrow-necked bottle") is used as a stand-in for the name of General Secretary of the Chinese Communist Party Xí Jìnpíng.

In an interview study, most creators that were interviewed suspected TikTok's automated moderation was scanning the audio as well, leading them to also use algospeak terms in speech. Some also label sensitive images with innocuous captions using algospeak, such as captioning a scantily-dressed body as "fake body". The use of gestures and emojis are common in algospeak, showing that it is not limited to written communication. A notable example is the use of the watermelon emoji on social media as a pro-Palestinian symbol in place of the Palestinian flag in order to avoid censorship by Facebook and Instagram. Black creators may simply present their light-colored palms to the camera to stand in for white people, and flip them to stand in for black people.

== Impact and detection ==
A 2022 poll showed that nearly a third of American social media users reported using "emojis or alternative phrases" to subvert content moderation.

Algospeak can lead to misunderstandings. A high-profile incident occurred when American actress Julia Fox made a seemingly unsympathetic comment on a TikTok post mentioning "mascara", not knowing its obfuscated meaning of sexual abuse. Fox later apologized for her comment. In an interview study, creators shared that the evolving nature of content moderation pressures them to constantly innovate their use of algospeak, which makes them feel less authentic.

A 2024 study showed that GPT-4, a large language model, can often identify and decipher algospeak, especially with example sentences. Another study shows that sentiment analysis models often rate negative comments incorporating simple letter–number substitution and extraneous hyphenation more positively.

== Examples ==
According to The New York Times:

- (to) unalive, unalived – to kill; killed, dead.
- accountant – sex worker
- cornucopia – homophobia
- le dollar bean – lesbian, as derived from the written form Le$bian
- leg booty – the LGBTQ+ community
- nip nops – nipples
- panini, panoramic – a pandemic, especially the COVID-19 pandemic
- seggs – sex

Other examples:

- acoustic, artistic, 'tism – autistic
- antiseptic – antisemitic
- blink in lio – link in bio
- camping – abortion
- cheese pizza – child pornography
- fork – fuck
- grape – rape
- Yahtzee, Nahtzee – Nazi
- juice – Jews
- pew pew – guns
- Keep Yourself Safe – abbreviates to 'KYS', which also stands for 'kill yourself'
- music festival – protest
- mustache man, Austrian painter – Adolf Hitler
- opposite of love – hatred
- ouid – weed
- Panda Express – pandemic
- PDF file or PDF – pedophile
- pinwheel – Swastika
- regarded, restarted – retarded
- sewer slide – suicide
- shmex – sex
- Triple K – Ku Klux Klan
- yt – White people (as in whitey), though yt is also a common abbreviation for YouTube

== See also ==
- Cant – Linguistic term for jargon of a group
- Chilling effect – Discouragement of exercising rights by threats of legal sanctions
- Dog whistle (politics) – Political messaging using coded language
- Euphemisms for Internet censorship in China
- Internet censorship
- Koalang – Fictional language
- Newspeak
