= Algospeak (book) =

2025 non-fiction book by Adam Aleksic

Algospeak: How Social Media Is Transforming the Future of Language
- Book cover
- Author: Adam Aleksic
- Language: English
- Subject: Internet linguistics
- Published: July 15, 2025
- Publisher: Knopf
- Pages: 256
- ISBN: 9780593804070
- Website: www.etymologynerd.com

Algospeak: How Social Media Is Transforming the Future of Language is a 2025 popular science book by the content creator Adam Aleksic (known online as Etymology Nerd) about the internet's role in modern linguistic phenomena.

Published by Knopf, the book released on July 15, 2025. Aleksic presented the book at Harvard Book Store on July 16.

== Contents ==
The book argues the internet and social media are key drivers of recent linguistic innovation, crossing outside online spaces, which necessitates an expanded definition of algospeak.

Large portions of the book are about social media algorithms' driving of content creators to optimise and self-censor for greater reach, often adopting niche labels (e.g. "goblincore") to reach their ideal audiences, which allows those audiences to be more precisely targeted for advertisement.

Frequently, Aleksic draws on his own experience as a content creator as evidence for his claims: in one chapter, he analyses how a video discussing the controversial phrase "from the river to the sea" underperformed when compared to his other videos.

Aleksic documents how the wider public adopts slang from minority groups on social media, criticizing it as a form of cultural appropriation.

== Reception ==
British culture magazine Our Culture listed Algospeak on its list of most anticipated books set to release in the summer of 2025. Kirkus Reviews commented that the book is "an insightful and entertaining examination of social media's impact on how we speak." Reason praised the book for its exploration of how differing ideological subcultures—from incels to LGBT activists—develop strategies to avoid censorship. Washington Free Beacon gave a positive review, but lamented that it did not challenge "the groupthink implicated in online trends".

New Scientist opined that while the book will quickly be outdated, "The underlying insights on how technology shapes language, however, will stay relevant." Aleksic's writing was described as "personable and knowledgeable" in a review for the Associated Press, which also gave kudos for the book's accessible style. The Los Angeles Review of Books described Algospeak as "a fascinating work of etymological analysis."

== See also ==
- Because Internet
