= The Horologicon =

Non-fiction book by Mark Forscyth

The Horologicon: A Day's Jaunt Through the Lost Words of the English Language
- First edition
- Author: Mark Forsyth
- Language: English
- Published: 2012
- Publisher: Icon Books, Berkley
- Publication place: UK
- Pages: 286
- ISBN: 978-0425264379 reprint edition

The Horologicon: A Day's Jaunt Through the Lost Words of the English Language, published in 2012, is a non-fiction book about obscure words by Mark Forsyth.
