= Keysmash =

Internet slang

- Examples of keysmashes
- Meaning: Used to convey laughter, boredom, or other intense emotions

A keysmash (alternatively key smash, key mash or keyboard smash) is internet slang for the typing out of a random sequence of letters on a computer keyboard or touchscreen, often to express intense emotion. Gaining popularity since 2019, the term is often used to convey intense or indescribable emotions (such as frustration, excitement, or boredom), and it can also be used as an expression of laughter.

== History and usage ==
Dictionary.com lists keysmash as both a noun ("I typed a keysmash") and a verb ("I keysmashed a response"), dating the term to sometime between 1995 and 2000.

The first commonly used variation of "keysmashing" appeared and possibly first majorly originated from the Turkish internet sphere, where the so-called "random laugh", or "random" (as said in Turkish) has been in use since at least the mid-2000s in online forums, e.g., ekşisözlük, to convey and portray a more genuine laughter—implying a user "laughed so hard that they fell on (rolled over) their keyboard".

== Variations ==
Keysmashes of any kind can usually be seen in either all lower case, or all upper case letters. Despite how random many keysmashes may appear to be, there are societal patterns and norms to what a keysmash is supposed to look like. Keysmashes that fail to visually appeal to the ones typing them have a chance of being completely rewritten or having a few minor adjustments made (i.e., removing or adding new characters). The overall format of a keysmash is one that is usually dependent on the type of device or keyboard that is being used and therefore makes different keyboard layouts more acceptable for keysmashing than others.

=== QWERTY ===
Layout of a QWERTY keyboard

Keysmashes typed on QWERTY keyboards are not as randomized as the action of keysmashing tends to imply. QWERTY keysmashes consistently begin with the letter "a", which are often followed by the letters "sdf" which can combine to form a strand of letters commonly associated with keysmashing. The letters "asdf" appear as their own slang term in several online dictionaries such as dictionary.com. The typical keysmash tends to be much longer than "asdf"; because of this, it rarely appears as a keysmash on its own. QWERTY keysmashes tend to be made up of letters and characters from what is referred to as the keyboard's home row, which includes the letters a, s, d, f, g, h, j, k, l as well as two special characters, the semicolon (;) and apostrophe ('). When keysmashing, these letters do not usually appear in this exact order and are more often seen alternating and repeating to form a randomized pattern. Keysmashes can include letters and characters from both the top and bottom row as the keyboard as well, though more commonly from the top row (qwe...) than the bottom (zxc...), but rarely include numbers.

=== Smartphone keyboards ===
While a majority of smartphone virtual keyboards continue to use a type of QWERTY layout, the positioning of a user's fingers over a phone screen vary from that of a physical keyboard. Because of this, the increase in smartphone technology has led to new combinations of keysmashes that look different from their physical QWERTY predecessors. Examples of these new patterns can include "gbgdgdhfbhfchd", "akskskdkfjansnf" or "hdhfhdjs", all of which are the effects of users' fingers hovering over the center of smartphone keyboards rather than QWERTY's home row. Keysmashes made using this method rarely include numbers or special characters.

=== Dvorak ===
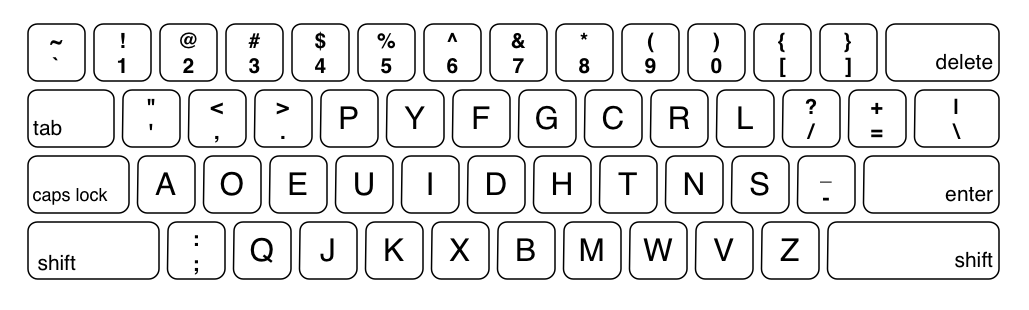
Layout of a Dvorak keyboard

The home row of Dvorak keyboards varies greatly from that of QWERTY keyboards, beginning with the vowels "aoeu" instead of "asdf". Gretchen McCulloch reports having talked with several Dvorak keyboard users who gave up keysmashing because the layout of their keyboards produced patterns that were "socially illegible".

=== Other languages ===
Other languages may have special characters, different symbols, and such more. Popular instances of these characters can be found in the Turkish and German languages, specifically with special letters such as ß, Ö, Ş, Ç, Ğ, Ü, İ and ı.

=== VSCO culture ===
In "VSCO kid" culture, there is a variant of the standard keysmash that uses a repetitive pattern of "ksksksk" that replaces the stereotypical smashing of random keys from which keysmashing earned its name. Generally, the usage of "ksksks" is similar to that of the usual QWERTY keysmash in that it is often used to express a form of laughter or other unidentifiable emotion.

In 2019, the usage of "ksksks" became most commonly associated with what the internet refers to as VSCO girls, but there is evidence on Twitter which dates its usage back to 2009 among Portuguese speakers located in Brazil. From 2010 on, it could be found used by a growing variety of people on social media, including people from the Black, gay, and UK communities.
