= Sin and Syntax =

Sin and Syntax: How to Craft Wickedly Effective Prose (1999), by Constance Hale, is an American English guide to stylish prose. The term is often used as a method of teaching writing in an innovative method that combines the academy and the street. The book approaches prose through words, sentences, and music (which includes voice, lyricism, melody and rhythm). It then breaks down each of these ideas into separate chapters that are themselves broken into "bones" (grammar lesson), "flesh" (writing lesson), "cardinal sins" (the don'ts) and "carnal pleasures" (the do's).

== Reviews ==
- Sin and Syntax is “an open-minded, exuberant approach to style that is intelligent and refreshing,” says The San Diego Union Tribune. “Hale questions authority and celebrates the vernacular while reminding us that "discretion, sensitivity, and masterful metaphor still matter."
- The Dallas Morning News says, “Nonwriters who just want advice that won’t put them to sleep will find sentences they can dance to.” The article continues by saying that Hale “makes an enjoyable case for English as a robust, swarthy tongue capable of surviving tumult and thriving on innovation.”
- The Arkansas Democrat-Gazette says that, "Sin and Syntax is, at almost 300 pages, much more than 'the little book' of Strunk and White. Hale includes the usual suspects," to make her points, but adds “examples from prose stylist Roger Angell on the catcher in baseball, "Talk of the Town" pieces from The New Yorker, George Orwell from Politics and the English Language.”
