= Day in the life =

Narrative device

Day in the life (or a day in the life, or day in the life of) is a genre of storytelling in which the events occurring in the life of the subject or subjects are those occurring in single day of their life.

Such storytelling is sometimes used as a form of journalism, where "[a] day-in-the-life story records the activities of someone through a period of time—such as the length of a day. The videojournalist shoots everything in hopes of capturing revealing details". The genre can be used to give the reader or viewer the sense of a typical day in the life of the subject without actually taking a day to present this material:

A film such as 'A Day In the Life of...' does, however, demonstrate one very important point. Though the passage of time can itself be the theme of the story, film time is not real time. A day in the life of an animal is presented in thirty or fifty minutes of film time. The film is a compressed, a speeded-up, account of a day. Yet the moving pictures of which the film is composed—the shots themselves—happen in real time. A shot of a ten-second event must last ten seconds. Even when slowed down or speeded up, we perceive the film time as if it were real time.

Although a day in the life story may present a distinct crisis arising and being dealt with, "some of the writers of these stories feel they are an exploration into the human condition and relationships, that a day in the life of a character, without a Climax and Resolution, is just as valid a storytelling model". A "day in the life" story could therefore also be a slice of life story, depicting the routine events of the life of the subject, although a slice of life story is not necessarily restricted to events occurring in the course of a single day.

== See also ==
- List of works set within one day
- Category:Novels set in one day
- Slice of life
- My Weekend as a 28-Year-Old in Chicago
