= The Clod and the Pebble =

Poem by William Blake

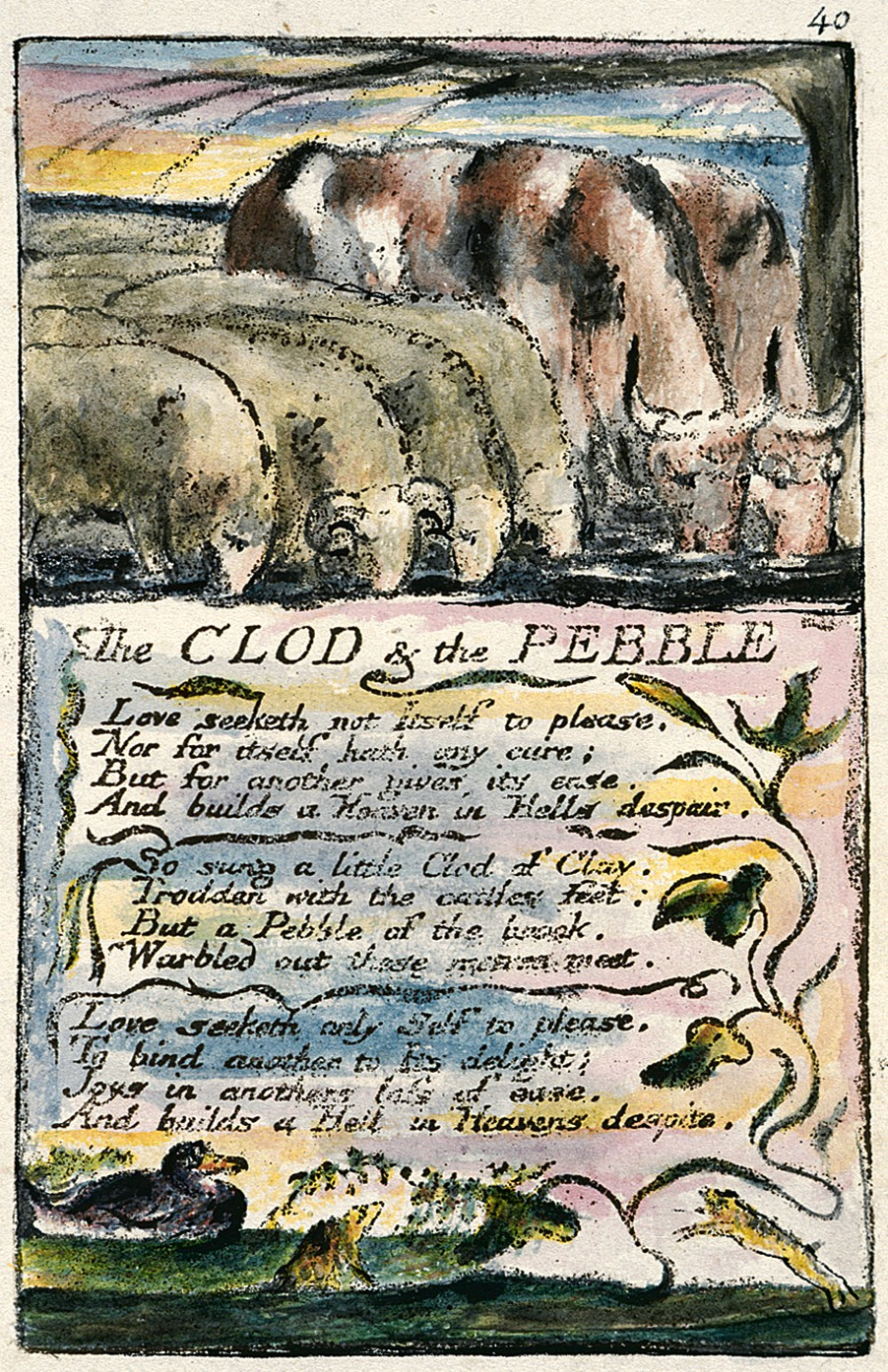
The Clod and the Pebble from Copy L of Songs of Innocence and of Experience held by the Yale Center for British Art.

"The Clod and the Pebble" is a poem from William Blake's 1794 collection Songs of Innocence and of Experience.

== The poem ==
Love seeketh not Itself to please,
Nor for itself hath any care;
But for another gives its ease,
And builds a Heaven in Hells despair.

So sung a little Clod of Clay,
Trodden with the cattles feet:
But a Pebble of the brook,
Warbled out these metres meet.

Love seeketh only Self to please,
To bind another to Its delight:
Joys in anothers loss of ease,
And builds a Hell in Heavens despite.

== Summary ==
"The Clod and the Pebble" is the exemplification of Blake's statement at the beginning of Songs of Innocence and of Experience that it is the definition of the "Contrary States of the Human Soul". It shows two contrary views of love. The poem is written in three stanzas. The first stanza is the clod's view that love is unselfish. This soft view of love is represented by a soft clod of clay, and represents the innocent state of the soul, and a childlike view of the world. The second stanza connects the clod and the pebble. It gives the location of the clod, pleasantly singing its view while being trodden on by cattle. At the end of the 2nd line the shift in views is signaled by a semicolon. This shift is further emphasized with the use of the word "But" at the beginning of the third line. The pebble is meanwhile in the river warbling its view. The final stanza is the pebble's view of selfish love, and it is set up in a parallel structure to the clod's stanza on unselfish love.

== Themes ==
=== Love ===
Different views of love are exemplified in this poem. According to Joseph Heffner the clod singing "connotates a blissful joyfulness" and it believes that love is unselfish. The pebble meanwhile has the opposite view that love is in fact selfish. These differing views can also be seen as the difference between masculine and feminine love.

=== Innocence ===
The clod in this poem represents innocence. Its view of love is, according to Joseph Heffner, full of "childlike innocence". The choice of a clod of clay to represent this innocent view of love is significant because it is soft, and this view point is easily squished by life, or in this poem the foot of a cow. The clod also represents innocence because it is made of clay, the same material God used to mold Adam.

=== Experience ===
The pebble, with its solid and hard structure, represents being hardened by the experience of love and has, according to Joseph Heffner, gained authority through that experience. The pebble views love as something that is selfish. Also according to Joseph Heffner the use of the word "bind" by the pebble "suggests a sort of aggressive, violent and masculine view of love".

== Literary influence ==
The last stanza of the poem, the pebble's view of selfish love, was used as the epigraph for Evelyn Scott's 1921 novel The Narrow House. According to Pat Tyler, the women in this novel have been "hardened by her life experiences. Each is solely concerned with her own survival, hardened to the suffering of the others".

The poem is also referenced, albeit misquoted, in The Goshawk by T. H. White, and in Graham Greene's novel The Human Factor.
