= The Etymologicon =

2011 book by Mark Forsyth

The Etymologicon: A Circular Stroll through the Hidden Connections of the English Language
- Author: Mark Forsyth
- Publisher: Icon Books
- Publication date: 3 November 2011
- Pages: 288
- ISBN: 9781848313071

The Etymologicon: A Circular Stroll through the Hidden Connections of the English Language is a non-fiction book by English writer Mark Forsyth published in 2011. The book presents the surprising origin of everyday words used in English, with each definition being thematically linked to the next to provide a flowing narrative unlike reference books on etymology. The content of the book was derived from the author's blog, The Inky Fool.

The book was chosen and adapted in December 2011 by BBC Radio 4 for its Book of the Week series. After being featured on the radio, the book became the 2011 Christmas best-seller in the UK.
