= Lauren Gawne =

Australian linguistics researcher

- Education: University of Melbourne
- Occupation: Researcher
- Scientific career
- Fields: Linguistics, language documentation, Tibeto-Burman languages, gesture, evidentiality
- Workplaces: La Trobe University (2017–); SOAS University of London (2014–2016); University of Melbourne (2012–2014); Nanyang Technological University (2014–2015)
- Website: scholars.latrobe.edu.au/l2gawne

Lauren Gawne is a linguistics researcher and academic communicator, most known for her work on gesture and in the linguistics of emoji, as well as the grammar of the Tibeto-Burman language Yolmo.

== Early life and education ==
Lauren Gawne was educated at the University of Melbourne, studying a BA in linguistics and art history and subsequently a linguistics PhD under the supervision of Barbara Kelly and Rachel Nordlinger which she received in 2013.

== Career and impact ==
After completing her PhD, Gawne worked at Nanyang Technological University and then the School of Oriental and African Studies. She subsequently took up fellowship in La Trobe University's department of languages and linguistics as a David Myers Research Fellow in 2017 and has worked there as a senior lecturer since 2019. During 2017-19, she was also vice president of the Australian Linguistic Society and was subsequently chair of the board of Living Languages in 2020. She also co-chaired the Research Data Alliance linguistics data interest group, developing best practices for research data management and data citation in the discipline.

Her research focuses on evidentiality and gesture, particularly in Tibeto-Burman languages such as Yolmo. She also researches the contemporary use of emojis and comments on the gestural elements of English speakers.

She is additionally active in academic outreach via writing for The Big Issue, running a linguistics website, and running the Lingthusiasm podcast series, which she co-hosts with Gretchen McCulloch.

== Awards and honours ==
Lauren Gawne received the 2014 Talkey award from the Australian Linguistics Society for her work on academic outreach.

== Bibliography ==
- Gesture: a slim guide. Oxford: Oxford University Press. 2025. ISBN 978-0-19-285507-7.
