= Parataxis =

Literary technique

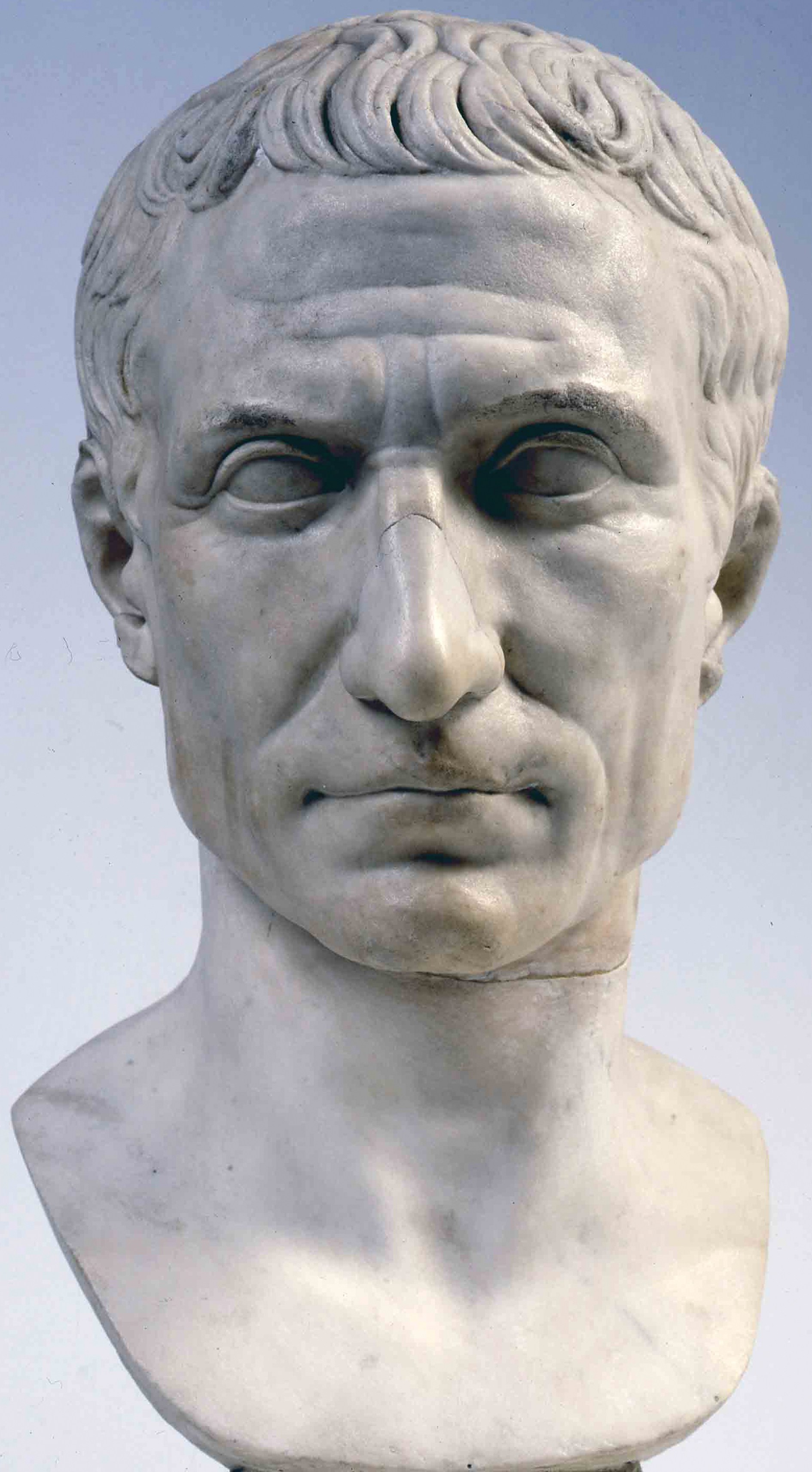
Julius Caesar (above) who, according to Plutarch, paratactically said "veni, vidi, vici" ("I came, I saw, I conquered").

Parataxis (from Greek: παράταξις, "act of placing side by side"; from παρα, para "beside" + τάξις, táxis "arrangement") is a literary technique in writing or speaking that favors short, simple sentences without conjunctions, or sentences coordinated without the use of subordinating conjunctions. Its antonym is hypotaxis.

It is also used to describe a technique in poetry in which two images or fragments, usually starkly dissimilar images or fragments, are juxtaposed without a clear connection. Readers are then left to make their own connections implied by the paratactic syntax. Ezra Pound, in his adaptation of Chinese and Japanese poetry, made the stark juxtaposition of images an important part of English-language poetry.

== Etymology ==
Parataxis comes from the Greek noun parataxis (Greek: παράταξις; "a placing side by side") from Greek verb paratasso (Greek: παρατάσσω; "to place side by side") ultimately deriving from the prefix para- (Greek: παρα; "beside") and tasso (Greek: τάσσω "to arrange, put in order").

Edward Parmelee Morris wrote in 1901 that the term was introduced into linguistics by Friedrich Thiersch in his Greek Grammar (1831). The term has remained unchanged, but the concept of parataxis has expanded.

== History ==
The term "parataxis" is a modern invention, but the paratactic style itself goes back to the classical age. Parataxis distinguished itself as a rhetorical style during the fourth and fifth century BCE because of the development of periodic methods used by orators. Ancient peoples believed these rhetorical styles originated in fifth century Sicily, where Corax and Tisias wrote books about new public speaking styles. It is believed these new methods were brought to Athens in 427 BCE by Gorgias. After Gorgias' visit to Athens, numerous handbooks were written about new styles of rhetoric. These handbooks have not survived the years, but it is known that they classified rhetorical styles, so it is assumed that the distinction between periodic syntax and more traditional techniques were made.

In the Rhetoric, Aristotle makes the earliest formal distinction between periodic syntax and older methods. He distinguishes between "lexis eiromene" and "lexis katestrammene". "Eiromene" means "to fasten together in rows" or "to string." Aristotle relates the term to the connection of clauses in a statement. Statements along these lines are referred to as unlimited, because the people listening to the speaker do not know how the sentence will end based on its beginning. Aristotle's section in his book regarding these styles of statements is seen today as the description of parataxis and is used to distinguish between Greek prose and periodic and paratactic techniques. Aristotle mentions that this style of writing had been used frequently at other times, but was hardly in use during his own time.

The prose narrative of the Hebrew Bible and the literalist approach of its King James translation which follows the same style, make heavy use of parataxis throughout. Modern translations tend to avoid this in an effort to be more explanatory.

== Description and use ==
Parataxis can most simply be described as and compared to the way children speak. They speak their ideas as they come to them, one after the other, without logically connecting the ideas together. Parataxis may use commas, semi-colons, and periods to force juxtaposition, but it can also replace these punctuation marks with coordinating conjunctions (such as "and") to seamlessly string the speech or written piece together and present the words as each being equally important. Works utilizing parataxis as a style may emit a staccato rhythm. This can result in phrases with words that don't seem to go together at all. An example of this is Julius Caesar's phrase "Veni, vidi, vici" or, "I came, I saw, I conquered." Parataxis can also be a pile of fast-moving ideas with a lack of or insistent rhythm. An example of this form of parataxis comes from the Bible: "And God said, "Let there be light," and there was light."

Parataxis may be considered from three points of view: the outer expression of internal psychological features of experience, the linguistic means to express the paratactic relation, and the resulting sentence structure.

The underlying idea is that, in a connected discourse, complete independence among the consecutive sentences is very rare: "Parataxis," says Matthew Fuller, "always involves a virtuality that is hypotactic." This observation is captured in the expression "train of thought." For example, the sentence "The sun was shining brightly; we went for a walk" contains two independent clauses, while a similar sentence, "The sun was shining brightly, so we went for a walk" is composed of two dependent clauses related by a coordinating conjunction ("so," in this example).

In spoken language, this continuance from sentence to sentence is supported by intonation and timing (rhythm, pause). While details may differ among different languages and cultures, generally similar musicality and shortness of pauses indicate the continuation, while the change of tone and longer pause generally indicate the transition to another connected group of ideas.

In storytelling, storytellers utilize paratactic or syntactic styles. Parataxis is common among oral storytellers. When telling a story orally, there are many inconsistencies because of the lack of a written-down, word-for-word, multiply-checked draft. However, audiences do not set out to compare the stories word for word and are only interested in the main points of the story.

== Parataxis versus hypotaxis ==
Parataxis roughly translates to "arranging side by side", while hypotaxis translates to "arranging under." Parataxis omits subordinating conjunctions while hypotactic constructions focus on such conjunctions to connect their ideas using subordinates ideas to one another. Thus, hypotaxis can directly show relationships of cause and effect, chronology, and comparison.

Recent studies show that the Zamucoan languages are characterized by a rare syntactic configuration which is called para-hypotaxis, where coordination and subordination are used simultaneously to connect clauses (Bertinetto & Ciucci 2012).

== Examples ==
=== Literature ===
An example of parataxis is Mr. Jingle's speech in Chapter 2 of The Pickwick Papers by Charles Dickens:

"Come along, then," said he of the green coat, lugging Mr. Pickwick after him by main force, and talking the whole way. "Here, No. 924, take your fare, and take yourself off—respectable gentleman—know him well—none of your nonsense—this way, sir—where's your friends?—all a mistake, I see—never mind—accidents will happen—best regulated families—never say die—down upon your luck—Pull him UP—Put that in his pipe—like the flavour—damned rascals." And with a lengthened string of similar broken sentences, delivered with extraordinary volubility, the stranger led the way to the traveller's waiting-room, whither he was closely followed by Mr. Pickwick and his disciples.

Samuel Beckett's opening to his monologue "Not I" is another example:

Mouth: .... out ... into this world ... this world ... tiny little thing ... before its time ... in a godfor– ... what? .. girl? .. yes ... tiny little girl ... into this ... out into this ... before her time ... godforsaken hole called ... called ... no matter ... parents unknown ... unheard of ... he having vanished ... thin air ... no sooner buttoned up his breeches ... she similarly ... eight months later ... almost to the tick ... so no love ... spared that ... no love such as normally vented on the ... speechless infant ... in the home ... no ... nor indeed for that matter any of any kind ... no love of any kind ... at any subsequent stage ...

Hilaire Belloc's paratactically speaks to a woman in the "Sun" inn in The Path to Rome while trying to order wine— he reports his language as a "brutal way of speaking," but admitting its success in getting the woman to give her his drink:

Bring the wine. Set it here. See me drink it. Charge me your due.

Molly Bloom's soliloquy in James Joyce's Ulysses, one of the longest known examples of a run on sentence in English literature, is another famous example of this technique.

=== Greek ===
In What Is Called Thinking?, Martin Heidegger addresses the paratactic nature of Classical Greek texts. Through analyzing a fragment from Parmenides (typically translated "One should both say and think that Being is") Heidegger argues that modern syntactic translations of paratactic Greek texts often leave the meaning obscured. He suggests multiple translations of the fragment that may more closely resemble the paratactic Greek original. These include "needful : the saying also thinking too : being : to be," and "Useful is the letting lie before us, the taking-to-heart, too: beings in Being." Heidegger points to a modern linguistic bias that places paratactic language beneath syntactic language; paratactic language is often viewed as "child-like" or "primitive". He argues that a paratactic sentence a child might say, such as "dog, woof-woof, bad" is not inherently less meaningful than its syntactic equivalent, like "dogs bark and can be dangerous."

== In visual arts ==
The term parataxis has been used by some cultural theorists such as Theodor W Adorno and Frederic Jameson, to describe certain works of art or "cultural texts" in which a series of scenes or elements are presented side by side in no particular order or hierarchy. Examples range from the collages of the dadaists and Robert Rauschenberg to many contemporary music videos such as Lana Del Rey - “National Anthem (2012). The traditional polyptych constitutes another example.

== See also ==
- Hypotaxis
- Polysyndeton and Asyndeton
