= Mark Forsyth =

British writer (born 1977)

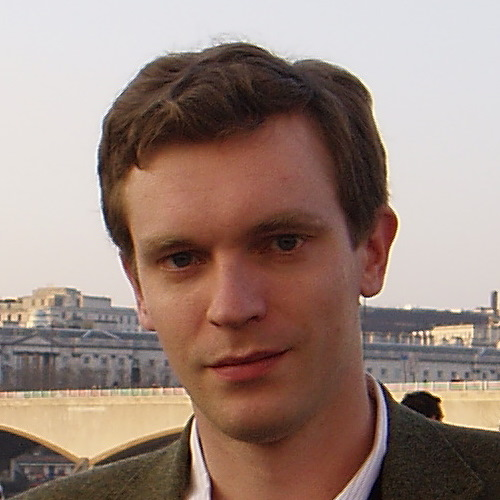
- Mark Forsyth
- Born: 2 April 1977 (age 49); London, England
- Education: Lincoln College, Oxford (1999)
- Occupation: Author
- Writing career
- Language: English
- Notable works: The Etymologicon, The Horologicon, The Elements of Eloquence

Mark Forsyth (born 2 April 1977) is a British writer of non-fiction who came to prominence with a series of books concerning the meaning and etymology of English words.

He is the author of best-selling books The Etymologicon, The Horologicon, and The Elements of Eloquence, as well as being known for his blog The Inky Fool. Forsyth's earlier work was based around the meaning of words and more specifically, obscure and out-of-use words. His first two books were featured on BBC Radio 4's series Book of the Week.

In June 2012, Forsyth gave a TEDx talk entitled "What’s a snollygoster? A short lesson in political speak".

== Education ==
Forsyth attended Winchester College in Winchester, Hampshire, England from 1990 to 1995. He also studied English Language & Literature at Lincoln College, Oxford University, from 1996 to 1999.

== Career ==
=== The Inky Fool ===
As a self-described journalist, proofreader, ghostwriter and pedant, Forsyth started a blog called Inky Fool in 2009 as a forum to share his love of words. His posts often involve an exploration of words; where they come from and how they relate to each other. "Etymology is fun," Forsyth said in a Skepticality interview. "Some people talk about the true meaning. I just find it interesting and delightful and often just very, very funny. That's the main thing I love about etymology."

=== The Etymologicon ===
The popularity of Inky Fool led to Forsyth's first book publishing deal in 2011 with Icon Books. In The Etymologicon: A Circular Stroll Through the Hidden Connection of The English Language, Forsyth explains the meanings and derivations of well-known words and phrases, and explores the strange connections between words in a stream-of-consciousness fashion. The book's title, originally called Point Blank Check Mate: The Inky Fool's Book of Word Association, references the poet John Milton who purportedly invented the word "etymologicon" to describe a book containing etymologies. The book's structure leads the reader to "unexpected coinages and devious linkages, sexy, learned and satisfyingly obscure." It is, according to reviewer Karin Schimke, "a cursory run through history presented with a wry eye and a peculiar sense of humor." Reviewer Robert McCrum wrote: "Not since Eats, Shoots & Leaves has a book about language...attracted so much attention in bookshops, running through successive reprints." The Etymologicon was a Sunday Times No. 1 Bestseller in January 2012.

While The Etymologicon falls into the category of edutainment, the examples Forsyth includes in the book are well researched and supported by evidence. His goal was to include as much scholarly information as "lightly" as possible. Forsyth researches words and phrases as far back to their original sources as he can find. "Often, the joy of the research," he said in a Chicago Tribune interview, "is finding examples of the original usages that have been lost for centuries. For example, humble pie used to be umble pie because the umbles were the innards of a deer (so it was the poor man's equivalent of venison pie). I actually found a recipe book from 1727 deep in the bowels of the British Library that gave instructions on how to make it. So I did. And it was delicious."

In The Etymologicon, Forsyth cautions against what he calls "the danger of inductive reasoning" when determining the commonality among diverse languages. Some patterns in language, he asserts, are mere coincidence and linguists meticulously document specific examples of word and sound changes to determine whether or not disparate languages are, indeed, connected.

The Illustrated Etymologicon (Icon Books) won the Trade Illustrated award at The 2022 British Book Design and Production Awards (BBDPA) on 18 January 2023.

=== The Horologicon ===
The Horologicon: A Day's Jaunt Through the Lost Words of the English Language is Forsyth's second book and contains "weird words for familiar situations." Many of these words are no longer in use, such as snollygoster, durgeon and frumples. To avoid having his list of words "form what is technically known as a dictionary," Forsyth arranges The Horologicon or Book of Hours according to the hours in a day: from dawn, through breakfast, commuting, office life, shopping, going out drinking and stumbling home. Forsyth believes some of these words should be revived: "Never mind the puzzled looks," he says, "just use them. Throw them into conversation as often as possible." A reviewer in The Daily Telegraph wrote: "From ante-jentacular to snudge by way of quafftide and wamblecropt, at last you can say, with utter accuracy, exactly what you mean."

The Wall Street Journal said the book “confirmed his aptitude for making a journey in the linguistic backwoods seem both leisurely and instructive.”

=== The Elements of Eloquence ===
The Elements of Eloquence: Secrets of the Perfect Turn of Phrase is Forsyth's third book. Described as a writer's tool-kit or recipe book, The Elements of Eloquence outlines 38 rhetorical figures (e.g., hyperbole, epizeuxis, catachresis) that, according to Forsyth, can be learned by almost anybody. Forsyth uses examples from William Shakespeare, Lord Byron, Winston Churchill, Lord Tennyson, Lewis Carroll, Quentin Tarantino, John Lennon and Katy Perry to reveal "the secrets" behind memorable lines and phrases. One reviewer wrote: "It's doubtful that if more people knew Forsyth's The Elements of Eloquence, the world would be a better place, but it would certainly sound a great deal better."

A reviewer on The Wall Street Journal said that Forsyth "is adept at adding spice to received wisdom and popularizing the findings of academic linguists."

=== "The Unknown Unknown" ===
Forsyth's essay "Unknown Unknown: Bookshops and the Delight of Not Getting What You Wanted" was a special commission for Independent Booksellers Week. and celebrates the discoveries one can make at independent bookshops. In his essay, Forsyth makes the case for the lost pleasures of undirected browsing that cannot be achieved with an internet search. Reviewer Matthew Parris wrote:

As any sub-editor knows, and too few columnists acknowledge, a good headline can say it all. Mark Forsyth, whose passion is words, and whose book, The Etymologicon, proved probably the best-selling title in history that nobody can pronounce, has written an essay in booklet form to adorn the tables of Britain's bookshops. Its title page tells you succinctly why it should. The Unknown Unknown, it's called, and its subtitle is "Bookshops and the delight of not getting what you wanted." Not since I engaged a company called Difficult Access Cranes Ltd has the point been made before, as it were, you've even opened the tin.

=== A Christmas Cornucopia ===
A Christmas Cornucopia: The Hidden Stories Behind Our Yuletide Traditions was published on 3 November 2016.

=== A Short History of Drunkenness ===
A Short History of Drunkenness came out on 6 September 2018.

The book is a popular scientific description of the history of mankind's relationship with alcoholic beverages. The author begins with the Paleolithic period, and then examines the cultures of such countries and epochs as Sumer, ancient Egypt, the Aztec Empire, antiquity, the Middle Ages, the Muslim world, the Wild West, the Prohibition era, and Russia. The descriptions are accompanied by short excursions into history, anthropology, and sociology.

The New York Times Book Review called it an "entertaining bar-hop through the past 10,000 years".

== Other books ==
Forsyth wrote the introduction for the new edition of Collins English Dictionary. In it, he notes: "There are few pastimes in life as pleasurable and profitable as reading the dictionary. The plot is, of course, rather weak, and the moral of the whole thing slightly elusive; but for my money there isn't another book that comes close to it."

He also wrote a short chapter, "Who Named All the Cities", for a book compiled by Gemma Elwin Harris called Big Questions from Little People Answered by Some Very Big People.

== Radio and TED Talk appearances ==
- A Christmas Cornucopia, BBC Radio 4 (18 December 2016)
- Lost Words and Secret Connections, BBC Radio 4 (13 September 2016)
- Why Read Dictionaries with David Astle and Mark Forsyth, Radio National (26 May 2013)
- What's a snollygoster? A short lesson in political speak, TED talk (August, 2012)
- Do we overuse "literally"?, BBC Radio 4 (12 March 2012)
- Painting the Forth Bridge "finished", BBC Radio 4 (9 December 2011)

== Bibliography ==
=== Books ===
- The Illustrated Etymologicon: A Circular Stroll Through the Hidden Connections of the English Language (Icon Books, 2021), ISBN 978-1-785-78785-0
- A Short History of Drunkenness (Penguin Books Ltd, 2017), ISBN 978-0-241-29768-1
- The Unknown Unknown: Bookshops and the Delight of Not Getting What You Wanted (Icon Books, 2014), ISBN 978-1-848-31784-0
- The Elements of Eloquence: Secrets of the Perfect Turn of Phrase (Icon Books, 2013), ISBN 978-1-848-31621-8, and (Berkley Trade, 2014), ISBN 978-0-425-27618-1
- Horologicon: A Day's Jaunt Through the Lost Words of the English Language (Icon Books, 2012), ISBN 978-1-848-31415-3, and (Berkley Trade, 2013), ISBN 978-0-425-26437-9
- The Etymologicon: A Circular Stroll Through the Hidden Connections of the English Language (Icon Books, 2011), ISBN 978-1-848-31307-1 and (Berkley Trade, 2012) ISBN 978-0-425-26079-1

=== Articles ===
- "Where to find answers to questions you didn't ask" (The Independent, 29 June 2014)
- "The Poetry of the Trading Floor, Going Beyond Bears and Bulls" (The New York Times, 14 April 2014)
- "Bloody 'L'" (The Independent, 15 February 2014)
- "Save the soundbite! MARK FORSYTH" (The Spectator, 23 November 2013)
- "The Turkey's Turkey Connection" (The New York Times, 27 November 2013)
- "OMG, Cupid - this is the written word's golden age: Far from destroying literacy, the social media have given writing a new importance, especially in the art of wooing, says Mark Forsyth" (Sunday Times, 28 October 2012)
- "Tin tacks, syntax and Chinese sensibility: What a nation puts in its dictionaries tells us far more about it than history books ever can" (The Daily Telegraph, 17 July 2012)

== Fiction ==
=== Short stories ===
- "The Servant" (The Spectator, 13 December 2014)

== Quotes ==
- "When ink-stained etymologists are being jetted around the world and interviewed on television you know that something has gone horribly, horribly awry."
- "Rhetoric, classically speaking, is the whole art of persuasion. Everything from your argument to your hand gestures, right up to the argumentum ad baculum or argument by stick, which involves hitting somebody until they agree with you. But in the age of the soundbite, it's a much simpler business. Gone are the logical proofs, and the structure of an argument. What's left are the rhetorical tricks that can be applied to one sentence, the pullquote. Kennedy knew this. All you have to do is take the first half of the sentence and say it backwards and you're the hero of the Free World. That's chiasmus."
- "What I love about etymology is not the grand theories but the strange back alleys and extraordinary and ridiculous journeys that words take."
- Of his book Horologicon, Forsyth said: "It is for the words too beautiful to live long, too amusing to be taken seriously, too precise to become common, too vulgar to survive polite society, or too poetic to thrive in the age of prose."
- "There's absolutely no point in historians getting indignant about language. It's never going to stop changing – they're trying to hold back the tide like the Luddites."
- "Politics and advertising have always had a lot in common. They are both despised. They are both necessary if you want to shift the public. And they both rely on the consumer not knowing the figures of rhetoric."
- "Only in the bookshop, in the Good Bookshop, can you stumble across the book that you never knew you wanted, that will answer all the questions that you never knew to ask. It is there, waiting, but you cannot find it by searching. You must find it by chance. Somewhere on the shelf at the back, over to the right."
- "There is more to life than the figures of rhetoric; I just don't think there is much more."
