= Gretchen McCulloch =

Canadian linguist

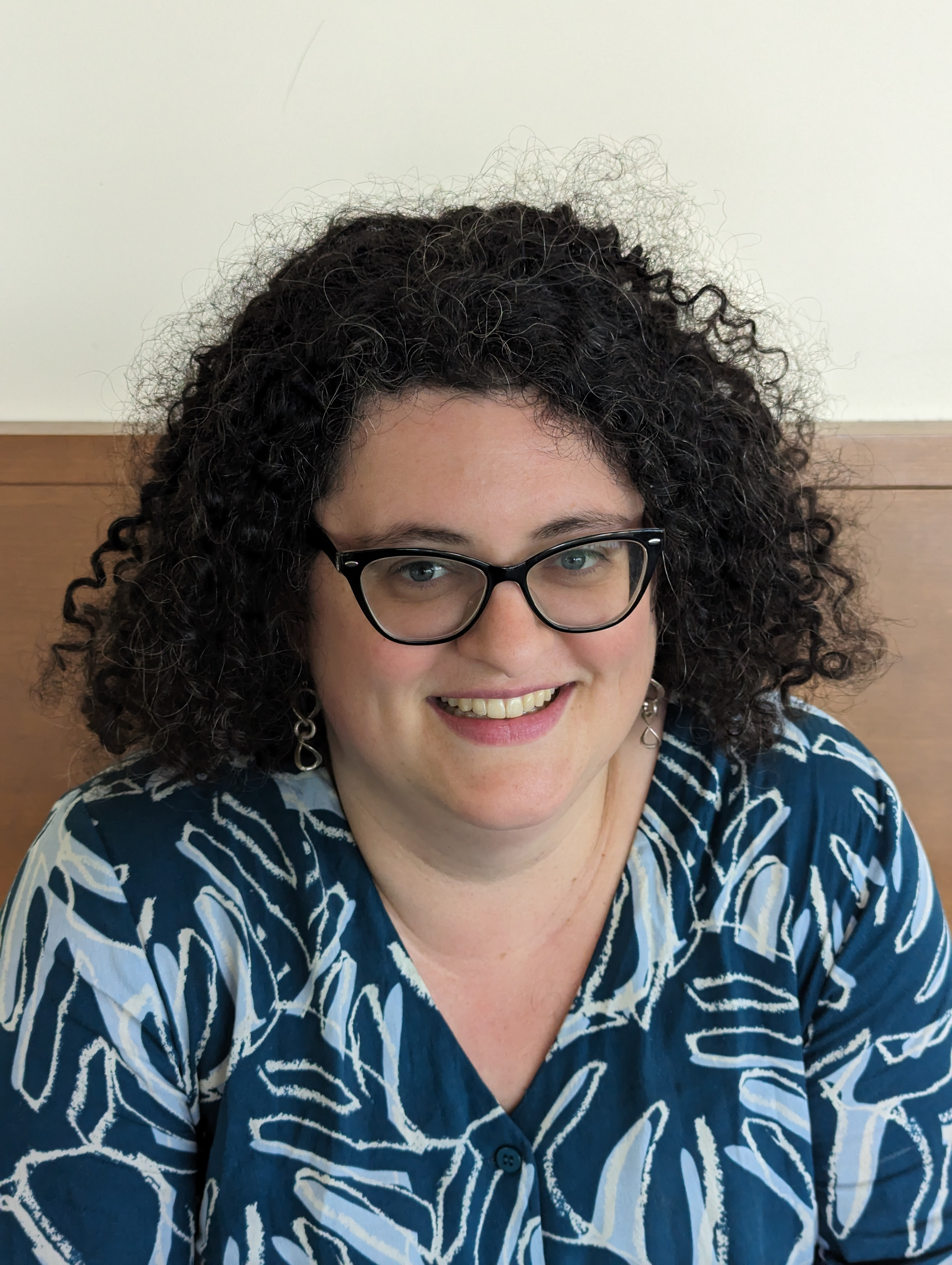
- Gretchen McCulloch at the University of Massachusetts, Amherst at the Linguistic Society of America Summer Institute

Academic background
- Education: McGill University (MA)

Academic work
- Discipline: Linguist
- Sub-discipline: Internet linguistics
- Website: gretchenmcculloch.com

Gretchen McCulloch (/məˈkʌlək/) is a Canadian linguist. On her blog, as well as her podcast Lingthusiasm (which she cohosts with Lauren Gawne) she offers linguistic analysis of online communication such as internet memes, emoji and instant messaging. She writes regularly for Wired and previously did so for The Toast. In 2019, she published a book on internet linguistics, Because Internet: Understanding the New Rules of Language.

== Education ==
McCulloch obtained a master's degree in linguistics at McGill University.

== Work ==
McCulloch's writing online focuses on internet linguistics. Her blog, which is titled "All Things Linguistic," posts or reposts content most weekdays. In it, she regularly discusses trends in use of English words, phrases and emoji in online communications as well as offering analysis of language form used in internet communications. She was a resident writer on linguistics at feminist website The Toast, where in 2014 she wrote an article analyzing the grammar of the doge meme. This article received coverage on BBC Radio 4, where McCulloch was interviewed on the subject by Evan Davis.

In 2019, McCulloch's first book, Because Internet: Understanding the New Rules of Language, was published by Riverhead Books. The book explores the history of online communication in English and the linguistic trends that have emerged within it over the years, as well as the effect such communication might have on the English language as a whole.

The book received critical acclaim from The New York Times and soon after the publication appeared on The New York Times Best Seller list. It also received positive reviews on National Public Radio and The Washington Post.

She has worked with YouTube presenters: she collaborated with Tom Scott on the "Language Files" videos on his channel, and was one of the producers on the linguistics series for Crash Course.

In 2021, McCulloch received the Linguistics, Language and the Public Award from the Linguistics Society of America.

== In popular culture ==
McCulloch was featured in the xkcd webcomic on 4 November 2020, commenting on the etymology, going back to Indo-European roots, for words meaning 'bear'.

On November 16, 2020, McCulloch wrote out the lyrics on Twitter to a parody of the song Jolene called "Vaccine", in response to news that Dolly Parton had contributed 1 million dollars toward the development of one of the most promising COVID-19 vaccines. The song was recorded by Ryan Cordell, an English professor at Northeastern University.
