= Ancient Greek accent =

The Ancient Greek accent was a melodic or pitch accent.

In Ancient Greek, one of the final three syllables of each word carries an accent. Each syllable contains a vowel with one or two vocalic morae, and one mora in a word is accented; the accented mora is pronounced at a higher pitch than other morae.

The accent cannot come more than three syllables from the end of the word. If the last syllable of a word has a long vowel, or is closed by two consonants, the accent usually cannot come on the antepenultimate syllable; but within those restrictions it is free.

In nouns the accent is largely unpredictable. Mostly the accent either comes as close to the beginning of the word as the rules allow, for example, πόλεμος pólemos 'war' (such words are said to have recessive accent), or it is placed on the last mora of the word, as in ποταμός potamós 'river' (such words are called oxytone). But in a few words, such as παρθένος parthénos 'maiden', the accent comes between these two extremes.

In verbs the accent is generally predictable and has a grammatical rather than a lexical function, that is, it differentiates different parts of the verb rather than distinguishing one verb from another. Finite parts of the verb usually have recessive accent, but in some tenses participles, infinitives, and imperatives are non-recessive.

In the classical period (5th–4th century BC) word accents were not indicated in writing, but from the 2nd century BC onwards various diacritic marks were invented, including an acute, circumflex, and grave accent, which indicated a high pitch, a falling pitch, and a low or semi-low pitch respectively. The written accents were used only sporadically at first, and did not come into common use until after 600 AD.

The fragments of ancient Greek music that survive, especially the two hymns inscribed on a stone in Delphi in the 2nd century BC, appear to follow the accents of the words very closely, and can be used to provide evidence for how the accent was pronounced.

Sometime between the 2nd and 4th centuries AD the distinction between acute, grave, and circumflex disappeared and all three accents came to be pronounced as a stress accent, generally heard on the same syllable as the pitch accent in ancient Greek.

== Types of accent ==
The ancient Greek grammarians indicated the word-accent with three diacritic signs: the acute (ά), the circumflex (ᾶ), and the grave (ὰ).

=== Acute ===
The acute was the most commonly used of these; it could be found on any of the last three syllables of a word. Some examples are:

- ἄνθρωπος ánthrōpos 'man, person'
- πολίτης polítēs 'citizen'
- ἀγαθός agathós 'good'

=== Circumflex ===
The circumflex, which represented a rising and then falling tone, is found only on long vowels, diphthongs and the digraph epsilon-iota, and only on the last two syllables of the word:

- σῶμα sôma 'body'
- γῆ gê 'earth'

When a circumflex appears on the final syllable of a polysyllabic word, it usually represents a contracted vowel:

- ποιῶ poiô 'I do' (contracted form of ποιέω poiéō)

=== Grave ===
The grave is found, as an alternative to an acute, only on the last syllable of a word.

When a word such as ἀγαθός agathós 'good' with final accent is followed by a pause (that is, whenever it comes at the end of a clause, sentence, or line of verse), or by an enclitic word such as the weak form of ἐστίν estín 'is' (see below), the accent is written as an acute:

- ἀνὴρ ἀγαθός anḕr agathós '[a] good man'
- ἀνὴρ ἀγαθός ἐστιν anḕr agathós estin '[he] is [a] good man'

However, when the word does not come before a pause or an enclitic, the acute accent is replaced by a grave:

- ἀγαθὸς ἄνθρωπος agathòs ánthrōpos 'a good person'

It is generally assumed that when a word was written with a grave it indicates that there was no rise in pitch, or only a small one.

=== Terminology ===
In all there are five different possibilities for placing an accent. The terms used by the ancient Greek grammarians were:

- Oxytone (ὀξύτονος): acute on the final syllable (e.g. πατήρ 'father')
- Paroxytone (παροξύτονος): acute on the penultimate (e.g. μήτηρ 'mother')
- Proparoxytone (προπαροξύτονος): acute on the antepenultimate (e.g. ἄνθρωπος 'person')
- Perispomenon (περισπώμενος): circumflex on the final (e.g. ὁρῶ 'I see')
- Properispomenon (προπερισπώμενος): circumflex on the penultimate (e.g. σῶμα 'body')

The word barytone (βαρύτονος) refers to any word which has no accent (either acute or circumflex) on the final syllable, that is the 2nd, 3rd and 5th possibilities above.

== Placing the accent marks ==
In Greek, if an accent mark is written on a diphthong or vowel written with a digraph such as ει, it is always written above the second vowel of the diphthong, not the first, for example:

- τοῖς ναύταις toîs naútais 'for the sailors'
- εἷς heîs 'one'

When a word such as a proper name starts with a capital vowel letter, the accent and breathing are usually written before the letter. If a name starts with a diphthong, the accent is written above the second letter. But in ᾍδης Hā́idēs 'Hades', where the diphthong is the equivalent of an alpha with iota subscript (i.e. ᾇ), it is written in front:

- Ἥρα Hḗra 'Hera'
- Αἴας Aías 'Ajax'
- ᾍδης Hā́idēs 'Hades'

When combined with a rough or smooth breathing, the circumflex goes on top of the breathing, while the acute or grave is written to the right of the breathing, as in the above examples. When an accent is combined with a diaeresis mark, as in νηΐ nēḯ, the accent is written on top.

== Tonal minimal pairs ==
Whether the accent on a particular syllable is an acute or circumflex is largely predictable, but there are a few examples where a change from an acute on a long vowel to a circumflex indicates a different meaning, for example

- λύσαι lúsai 'he might free' – λῦσαι lûsai 'to free'
- οἴκοι oíkoi 'at home' – οἶκοι oîkoi 'houses'
- φώς phṓs 'man' (poetic) – φῶς phôs 'light'

There are also examples where the meaning changes if the accent moves to a different syllable:

- μένω ménō 'I remain' – μενῶ menô 'I will remain'
- πείθω peíthō 'I persuade' – πειθώ peithṓ 'persuasion'
- ποίησαι poíēsai 'make!' (middle imperative) – ποιήσαι poiḗsai 'he might make' – ποιῆσαι poiêsai 'to make'
- μύριοι múrioi 'ten thousand' – μυρίοι muríoi 'countless'
- νόμος nómos 'law' – νομός nomós 'place of pasturage'
- Ἀθήναιος Athḗnaios 'Athenaeus' (proper name) – Ἀθηναῖος Athēnaîos 'Athenian'

There is also a distinction between unaccented (or grave-accented) and fully accented forms in words such as:

- τις tis 'someone' – τίς; tís? 'who?'
- που pou 'somewhere' / 'I suppose' – ποῦ; poû 'where?'
- ἢ ḕ 'or' / 'than' – ἦ ê 'in truth' / 'I was' / 'he said'
- ἀλλὰ allà 'but' – ἄλλα álla 'others (neuter)'
- ἐστὶ estì 'it is' – ἔστι ésti 'there is' / 'it exists' / 'it is possible'

== History of the accent in Greek writing ==
The three marks used to indicate accent in ancient Greek, the acute (´), circumflex (῀), and grave (`) are said to have been invented by the scholar Aristophanes of Byzantium, who was head of the famous library of Alexandria in Egypt in the early 2nd century BC. The first papyri with accent marks date from this time also. In the papyri, at first the accents were used only sporadically, specifically for helping readers to pronounce Greek poetry correctly, and the grave accent could be used on any non-accented syllable. Such accents were useful, since Greek at that time was written without gaps between the words. For example, in one papyrus, the word ὸρὲιχάλκωι òrèikhálkōi 'to brass' is written with grave accents on the first two syllables, in case any reader should mistakenly read the first part of the word as ὄρει órei 'to a mountain'.

In subsequent centuries many other grammarians wrote about Greek accentuation. The most famous of these, Aelius Herodianus or Herodian, who lived and taught in Rome in the 2nd century AD, wrote a long treatise in twenty books, 19 of which were devoted to accentuation. Although Herodian's book does not survive in full, an epitome (abridgement) was made of it around AD 400 which still survives. Another important authority was Apollonius Dyscolus, the father of Herodian.

The names of these diacritics in English, and the term "accent", are based on Latin loan-translations of the Greek terms. Latin accentus corresponds to Greek προσῳδία prosōidía "song sung to instrumental music, pitch variation in voice" (the word from which English prosody comes), acūtus to ὀξεῖα oxeîa "sharp" or "high-pitched", gravis to βαρεῖα bareîa "heavy" or "low-pitched", and circumflexus to περισπωμένη perispōménē "pulled around" or "bent". The Greek terms for the diacritics are nominalized feminine adjectives that originally modified the feminine noun προσῳδία and agreed with it in gender.

Diacritic signs were not used in the classical period (5th–4th century BC). They were gradually introduced from the 2nd century BC onwards, but did not become commonly used in manuscripts until after 600 AD.

== Origin of the accent ==
The ancient Greek accent, at least in nouns, appears to have been inherited to a large extent from the original parent language from which Greek and many other European and Indian languages derive, Proto-Indo-European. This can be seen by comparing the accent of Greek words with the accent of words in the Vedic hymns (the most ancient form of the Sanskrit language of India). Very often these are the same, for example:

- Vedic pā́t, Ancient Greek πούς 'foot' (nominative)
- Vedic pā́dam, Ancient Greek πόδα 'foot' (accusative)
- Vedic padás, Ancient Greek ποδός 'of a foot' (genitive)
- Vedic padí, Ancient Greek ποδί 'for a foot' (dative)

There are also other accentual correspondences between Greek and Vedic, for example:

- Vedic yugáṃ, Ancient Greek ζυγόν zugón 'yoke'
- Vedic áśvaḥ, Ancient Greek ἵππος híppos 'horse'
- Vedic śatáṃ, Ancient Greek ἑκατόν hekatón 'a hundred'
- Vedic návaḥ, Ancient Greek νέος néos 'new'
- Vedic pitā́, Ancient Greek πατήρ patḗr 'father'

One difference between Greek and Vedic, however, is that in Greek words the accent is always found in one of the last three syllables, whereas in Vedic (and presumably in Proto-Indo-European) it could come anywhere in the word.

The distinction in Greek between circumflex and acute accent appears to be a Greek development, and does not go back to Proto-Indo-European.

== Pronunciation of the accent ==
=== General evidence ===
It is generally agreed that the ancient Greek accent was primarily one of pitch or melody rather than of stress. Thus in a word like ἄνθρωπος ánthrōpos 'man', the first syllable was pronounced on a higher pitch than the others, but not necessarily any louder. As long ago as the 19th century it was surmised that in a word with recessive accent the pitch may have fallen not suddenly but gradually in a sequence high–middle–low, with the final element always short.

The evidence for this comes from various sources. The first is the statements of Greek grammarians, who consistently describe the accent in musical terms, using words such as ὀξύς oxús 'high-pitched' and βαρύς barús 'low-pitched'.

According to Dionysius of Halicarnassus (1st century BC), the melody of speech is confined to an interval 'of about a 5th'. This statement has been interpreted in different ways, but it is usually supposed that he meant not that it was always a fifth, but that this was the maximum normal difference between high and low syllables. It is thought probable that occasionally, especially at the end of a sentence, the interval was much smaller. Dionysius also describes how a circumflex accent combines high and low pitch on the same syllable, whereas with an acute accent the high and low pitches are in separate syllables.

Another indication that the accent was melodic or tonal is that in the classical period the accents of the words seem to have played no part at all in poetic metres, unlike in languages such as English which have stress-accents. It was not until the 4th century AD that poems began to be written in which the accent played a role (see below).

=== Evidence from music ===
An important indication of the melodic nature of the Greek accent comes from the surviving pieces of Greek music, especially the two Delphic hymns (2nd century BC), the Seikilos epitaph (1st century AD), and the hymns of Mesomedes (2nd century AD). An example is the prayer to Calliope and Apollo written by Mesomedes, court musician to the Emperor Hadrian:

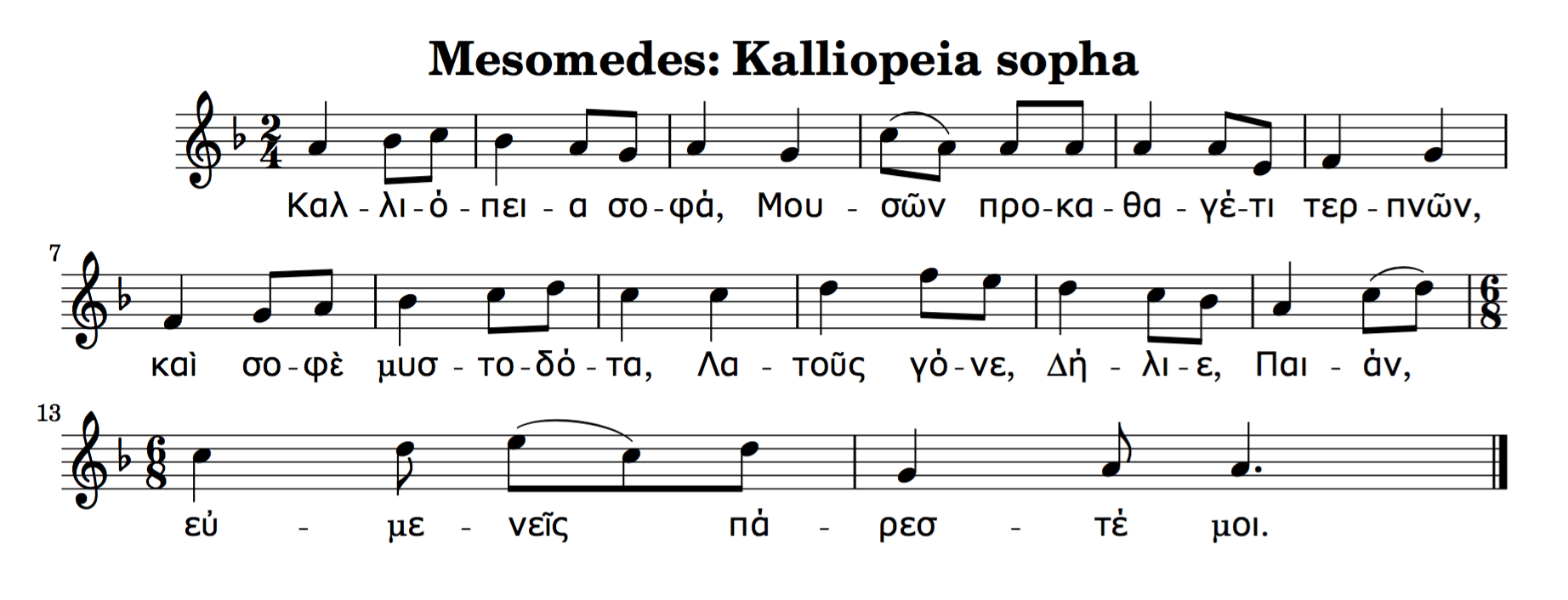
Mesomedes' Prayer to Calliope and Apollo transcribed into modern musical notation; adapted from Landels, John G. 1999. Music in Ancient Greece and Rome, p. 255. The words read: "Wise Calliope, leader of the delightful Muses, and you, wise initiator into the mysteries, Leto's son, Delian Healer, favour me with your presence." (For a recording, see External links below.)

(Further examples of ancient Greek music can be found in the articles Delphic Hymns and Mesomedes.)

As can be seen, the accented syllable of a word generally has the highest note within that word, although sometimes the syllables preceding or following the accent are also high.

When the accent is a circumflex, the music often shows a fall from a higher note to a lower one within the syllable itself, exactly as described by Dionysius of Halicarnassus; examples are the words Μουσῶν Mousôn 'of the Muses' and εὐμενεῖς eumeneîs 'favourable' in the prayer illustrated above. However, sometimes there is no fall within the accented syllable, but the circumflex is set to a single note, as in τερπνῶν terpnôn 'delightful' or Λατοῦς Latoûs 'of Leto' above.

If the accent is a grave, there is often no rise in pitch, or else only a small one, as in σοφὲ sophè above.

In this practice of closely imitating the tones of word accents in the melodies of songs, Ancient Greek resembles many living Asian and African languages that have tonal accents. For this reason, the American scholars A.M. Devine and Laurence Stephens have argued that the rises and falls found in Greek music probably give a reasonably good indication of what happened when the words were spoken.

It seems, however, that the music did not always follow the accent exactly. Dionysius of Halicarnassus gives an example from the music written by Euripides for his play Orestes. In the lines which in our modern editions are written as σῖγα, σῖγα, λεπτὸν ἴχνος ἀρβύλας // τίθετε, μὴ κτυπεῖτ᾽ (sîga, sîga, leptòn íkhnos arbúlas // títhete, mḕ ktupeît᾽) 'Quietly, quietly! Place the tread of your shoe lightly, don't make a noise!', Dionysius reports that in the first three words and the last there was no raised pitch, while in both ἀρβύλας arbúlas 'of the shoe' and τίθετε títhete 'place' there was a low note followed by two high ones, despite the accent on the first syllable of τίθετε títhete.

However, although the fragments of earlier music sometimes show a mismatch, the Delphic hymns in particular appear to show a very close relationship between the music and the word accents, with all but three of the 180 analysable words matching.

Some more details of the way in which accents were set to music are given below. Note that in the musical examples the pitch is conventional, dating back to a publication by Friedrich Bellermann in 1840. In performance the pitch would have been at least a minor third lower.

=== Acute accent ===
When the signs for the notes in Greek music are transcribed into modern musical notation, it can be seen that an acute accent is generally followed by a fall, sometimes extending over two syllables. Usually the fall is only a slight one, as in θύγατρες thúgatres 'daughters', Ὄλυμπον Ólumpon 'Olympus' or ἔτικτε étikte 'she gave birth to' below. Sometimes, however, the music has a sharp drop, as in μέλψητε mélpsēte 'you may sing' or νηνέμους nēnémous 'windless':

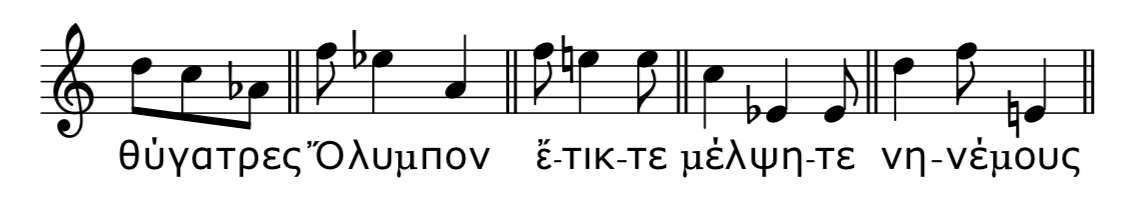
A selection of five words from Greek music showing the fall after an acute accent

On average, the rise before the accent is less than the fall afterwards. There is sometimes a jump up from a lower note, as in the word μειγνύμενος meignúmenos 'mingling' from the second hymn; more often there is a gradual rise, as in Κασταλίδος Kastalídos 'of Castalia', Κυνθίαν Kunthían 'Cynthian', or ἀνακίδναται anakídnatai 'spreads upwards':

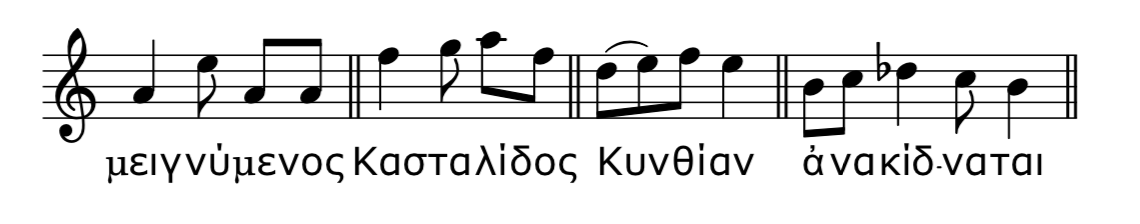
Four words from ancient Greek music showing the rise before the accent

In some cases, however, before the accent instead of a rise there is a 'plateau' of one or two notes the same height as the accent itself, as in Παρνασσίδος Parnassídos 'of Parnassus', ἐπινίσεται epinísetai 'he visits', Ῥωμαίων Rhōmaíōn 'of the Romans', or ἀγηράτῳ agērátōi 'ageless' from the Delphic hymns:

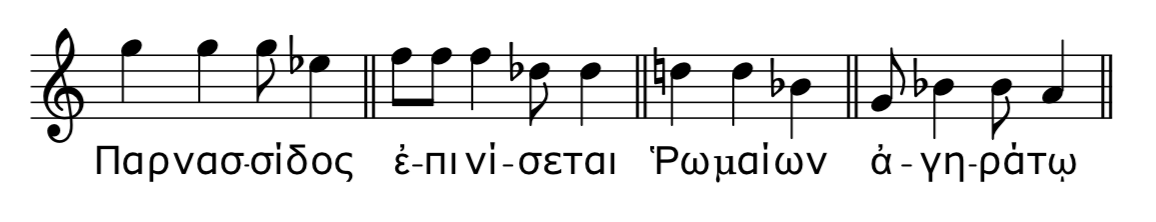
Four words from the Delphic hymns illustrating a plateau preceding the accent

Anticipation of the high tone of an accent in this way is found in other pitch-accent languages, such as some varieties of Japanese, Turkish, or Serbian, where for example the word papríka (pepper) can be pronounced pápríka. It would not be surprising therefore to find that it was a feature of Greek speech also. Devine and Stephens, however, argue that the norm in Greek words was for unaccented syllables to be low-pitched, citing Dionysius's statement that "there is only one high tone per word".

When an acute accent occurs on a long vowel or diphthong, it is generally assumed that the high pitch was on the second mora of the vowel, that is to say, that there was a rising pitch within the syllable. The Greek music sometimes shows exactly this, as with the word αἴθει aíthei 'it burns' in the 1st Delphic hymn, or φαίνου phaínou 'shine!' in the Seikilos epitaph, or Σελάνα Selána 'the Moon' in the Hymn to the Sun, in which the syllable with the acute is set to a melism of two or three notes rising gradually.

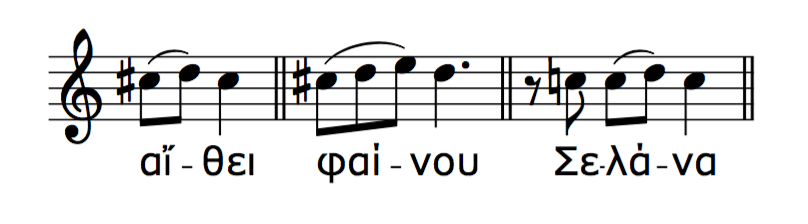
Three examples of a rising tone in Ancient Greek music

More frequently, however, on an accented long vowel in the music there is no rise in pitch, and the syllable is set to a level note, as in the words Ἅφαιστος Háphaistos 'Hephaestus' from the 1st Delphic hymn or ἐκείνας ekeínas 'those' or Ῥωμαίων Rhōmaíōn 'of the Romans' from the 2nd hymn:

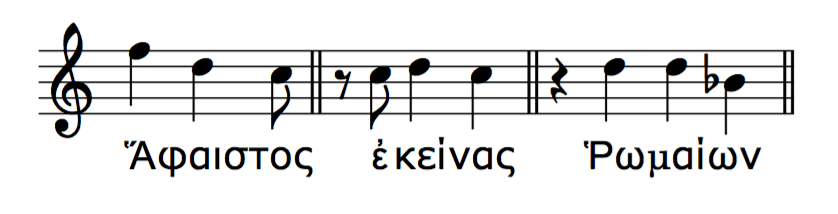
Three examples of a level tone from Ancient Greek music

Because this is so common, it is possible that at least sometimes the pitch did not rise on a long vowel with an acute accent but remained level. Another consideration is that although the ancient grammarians regularly describe the circumflex accent as 'two-toned' (δίτονος) or 'compound' (σύνθετος) or 'double' (διπλοῦς), they usually do not make similar remarks about the acute. There are apparently some, however, who mention a 'reversed circumflex', presumably referring to this rising accent.

=== Tonal assimilation ===
Devine and Stephens note that occasionally at the end of a word, the pitch rises again, as though leading up to or anticipating the accent in the following word. They refer to this as a "secondary rise". Examples are ἔχεις τρίποδα ékheis trípoda 'you have a tripod' or μέλπετε δὲ Πύθιον mélpete dè Púthion 'sing the Pythian' in the 2nd Delphic hymn. According to Devine and Stephens, it "probably reflects a genuine process of pitch assimilation in fluent speech".

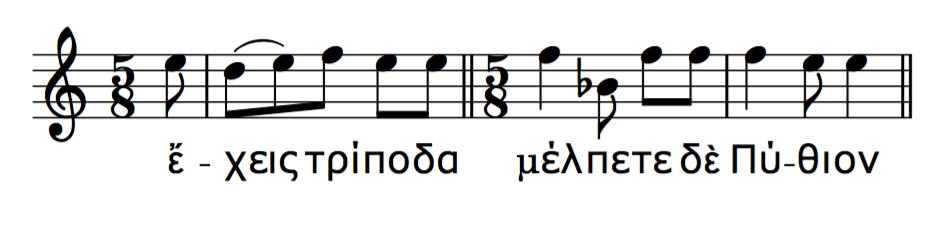
Two phrases from the 2nd Delphic Hymn illustrating secondary upturn at the end of a word

In the great majority of cases in the music, the pitch falls on the syllable immediately following an acute accent. However, there are some exceptions. One situation where this can happen is when two words are joined in a plateau or near-plateau, as in the phrases ἵνα Φοῖβον hína Phoîbon 'so that Phoebus' (1st Hymn) and πόλει Κεκροπίᾳ pólei Kekropíāi 'in the city of Cecrops' in the 2nd Delphic Hymn:

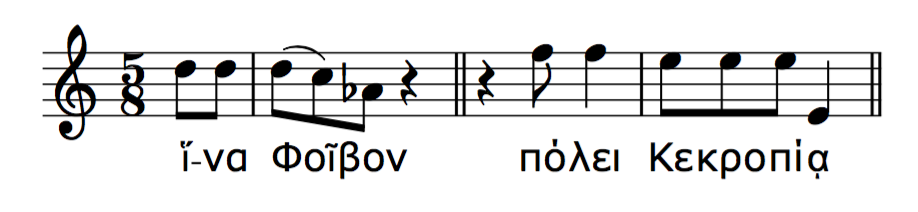
Two phrases from the Delphic hymns illustrating a plateau between accents.

Tonal assimilation or tone sandhi between neighbouring tones is commonly found in tonal languages. Devine and Stephens, citing a similar phenomenon in the music of the Nigerian language Hausa, comment: "This is not a mismatch but reflects a feature of phrase intonation in fluent speech."

=== Circumflex accent ===
A circumflex was written only over a long vowel or diphthong. In the music, the circumflex is usually set to a melisma of two notes, the first higher than the second. Thus in the first Delphic Hymn the word Φοῖβον Phoîbon 'Phoebus' is set to the same musical notes as θύγατρες thúgatres 'daughters' earlier in the same line, except that the first two notes fall within one syllable instead of across two syllables. Just as with the acute accent, a circumflex can be preceded either by a note on the same level, as in ᾠδαῖσι ōidaîsi 'with songs', or by a rise, as in μαντεῖον manteîon 'oracular':

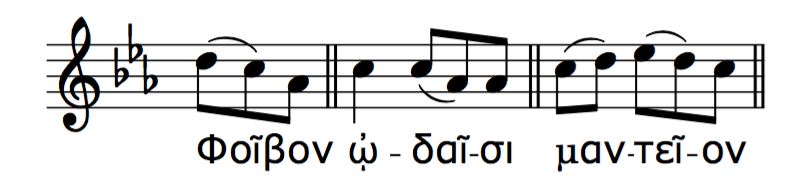
Examples of circumflex accents from the 1st Delphic Hymn

The circumflex therefore appears to have been pronounced in the same way as an acute, except that the fall usually took place within one syllable. This is clear from the description of Dionysius of Halicarnassus (see above), who tells us that a circumflex accent was a blend of high and low pitch in a single syllable, and it is reflected in the word ὀξυβάρεια oxubáreia 'high-low' (or 'acute-grave'), which is one of the names given to the circumflex in ancient times. Another description was δίτονος dítonos 'two-toned'.

Another piece of evidence for the pronunciation of the circumflex accent is the fact that when two vowels are contracted into one, if the first one has an acute, the result is a circumflex: e.g. ὁρά-ω horá-ō 'I see' is contracted to ὁρῶ horô with a circumflex, combining the high and low pitches of the previous vowels.

In the majority of examples in the Delphic hymns, the circumflex is set to a melisma of two notes. However, in Mesomedes' hymns, especially the hymn to Nemesis, it is more common for the circumflex to be set to a single note. Devine and Stephens see in this the gradual loss over time of the distinction between acute and circumflex.

One place where a circumflex can be a single note is in phrases where a noun is joined with a genitive or an adjective. Examples are μῆρα ταύρων mêra taúrōn (1st Delphic Hymn) 'thighs of bulls', Λατοῦς γόνε Latoûs góne 'Leto's son' (Mesomedes' Prayer to Calliope and Apollo), γαῖαν ἅπασαν gaîan hápasan 'the whole world' (Mesomedes' Hymn to the Sun). In these phrases, the accent of the second word is higher than or on the same level as that of the first word, and just as with phrases such as ἵνα Φοῖβον hína Phoîbon mentioned above, the lack of fall in pitch appears to represent some sort of assimilation or tone sandhi between the two accents:

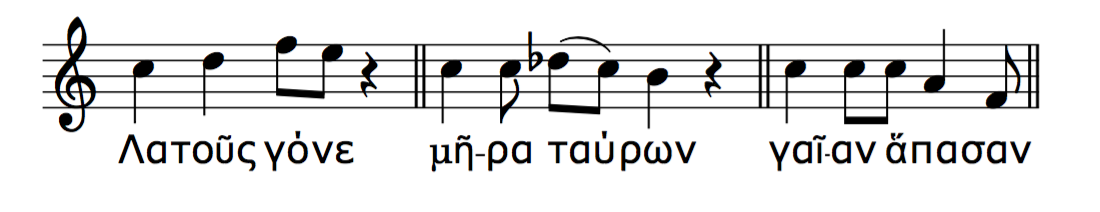
Three phrases from Greek music illustrating circumflex tones

When a circumflex occurs immediately before a comma, it also regularly has a single note in the music, as in τερπνῶν terpnôn 'delightful' in the Mesomedes' Invocation to Calliope illustrated above. Other examples are κλυτᾷ klutâi 'famous', ἰοῖς ioîs 'with arrows' in 2nd Delphic hymn, ζῇς zêis 'you live' in the Seikilos epitaph, and θνατῶν thnatôn, ἀστιβῆ astibê and μετρεῖς metreîs in Mesomedes' Hymn to Nemesis.

Another place where a circumflex sometimes has a level note in the music is when it occurs in a penultimate syllable of a word, with the fall only coming in the following syllable. Examples are παῖδα paîda, πᾶσι pâsi (1st Delphic hymn), λῆξε lêxe, σῷζε sôize, and Φοῖβον Phoîbon (2nd Delphic hymn), and χεῖρα kheîra, πῆχυν pêkhun (Hymn to Nemesis).

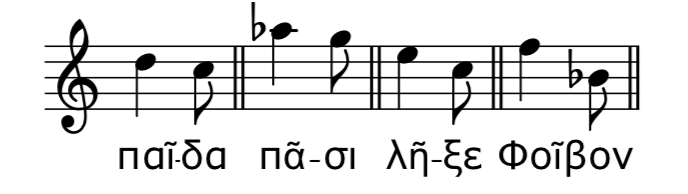
Four words from the Delphic hymns showing a level note for a circumflex

=== Grave accent ===
The third accentual mark used in ancient Greek was the grave accent, which is only found on the last syllable of words e.g. ἀγαθὸς ἄνθρωπος agathòs ánthrōpos 'a good man'. Scholars are divided about how this was pronounced; whether it meant that the word was completely accentless or whether it meant a sort of intermediate accent is unclear. In some early documents making use of written accents, a grave accent could often be added to any syllable with low pitch, not just the end of the word, e.g. Θὲόδὼρὸς.

Some scholars, such as the Russian linguist Nikolai Trubetzkoy, have suggested that because there is usually no fall after a grave accent, the rise in pitch which was heard at the end of a clause was phonologically not a true accent, but merely a default phrasal tone, such as is heard in languages like Luganda. Other scholars, however, such as Devine and Stephens, argue that on the contrary the grave accent at the end of a word was a true accent, but that in certain contexts its pitch was suppressed.

In the music, a word with a grave frequently has no accent at all, and is set to a single level note, as in these examples from the 2nd Delphic hymn, ὃν ἔτικτε Λᾱτὼ μάκαιρα hòn étikte Lātṑ mákaira 'whom blessed Leto bore' and τότε λιπὼν Κυνθίᾱν νᾶσον tóte lipṑn Kunthíān nâson 'then, leaving the Cynthian island', in which the words Λᾱτὼ Lātṑ 'Leto' and λιπὼν lipṑn 'having left' have no raised syllables:

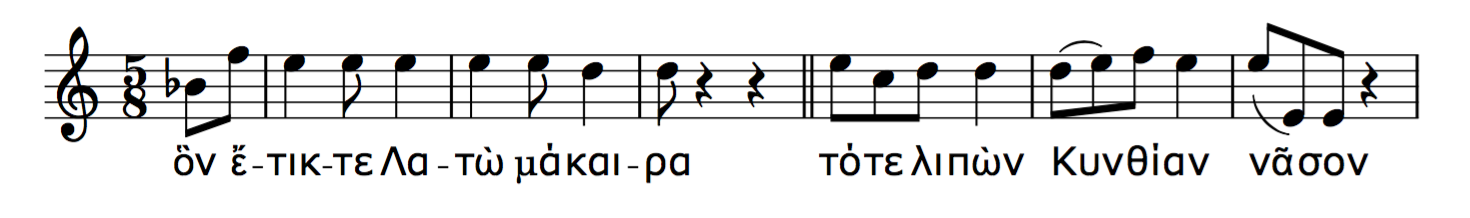
Phrases from the 2nd Delphic hymn illustrating the grave accent

However, occasionally the syllable with the grave can be slightly higher than the rest of the word. This usually occurs when the word with a grave forms part of a phrase in which the music is in any case rising to an accented word, as in καὶ σοφὲ μυστοδότα kaì sophè mustodóta 'and you, wise initiator into the mysteries' in the Mesomedes prayer illustrated above, or in λιγὺ δὲ λωτὸς βρέμων, αἰόλοις μέλεσιν ᾠδᾱ̀ν κρέκει ligù dè lōtòs brémōn, aiólois mélesin ōidā̀n krékei 'and the pipe, sounding clearly, weaves a song with shimmering melodies' in the 1st Delphic hymn:

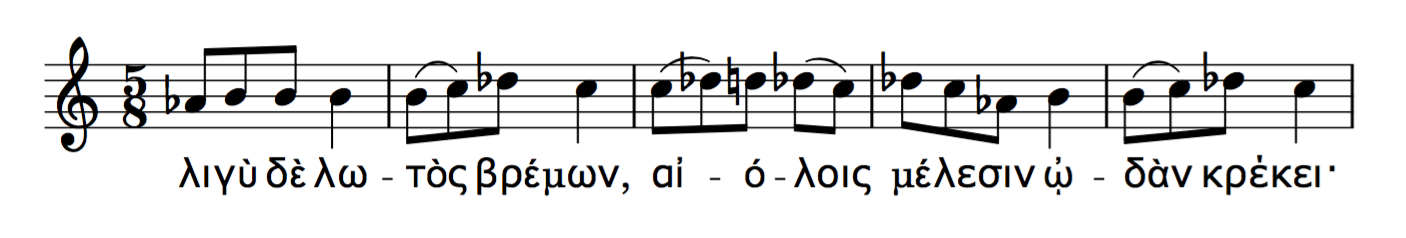
A line from the 1st Delphic Hymn showing the pronunciation of the grave accent.

In the Delphic hymns, a grave accent is almost never followed by a note lower than itself. However, in the later music, there are several examples where a grave is followed by a fall in pitch, as in the phrase below, kharopā̀ merópōn stréphetai túkhā 'the harsh fate of mortals turns' (Hymn to Nemesis), where the word χαροπᾱ̀ kharopā̀ 'harsh, grey-eyed' has a fully developed accent:

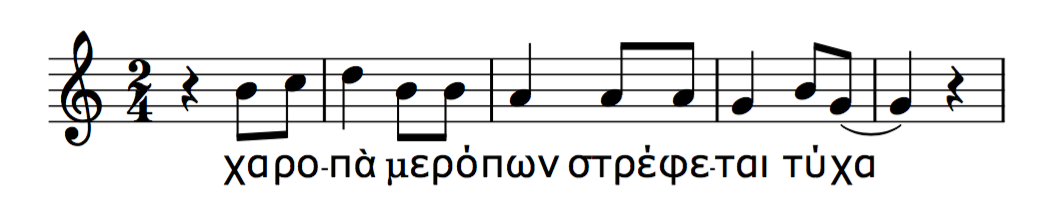
A phrase from Mesomedes' Hymn to Nemesis illustrating the grave accent

When an oxytone word such as ἀγαθός agathós 'good' comes before a comma or full stop, the accent is written as an acute. Several examples in the music illustrate this rise in pitch before a comma, for example Καλλιόπεια σοφᾱ́ Kalliópeia sophā́ 'wise Calliope' illustrated above, or in the first line of the Hymn to Nemesis (Némesi pteróessa bíou rhopā́ 'Nemesis, winged tilter of the scales of life'):

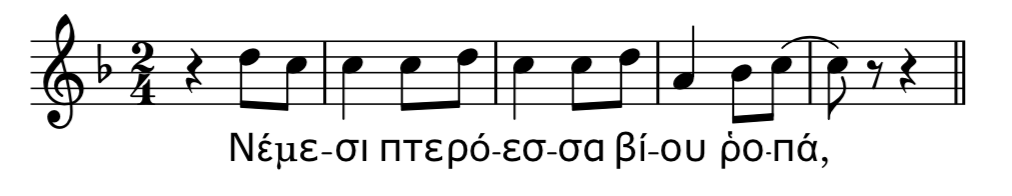
Example from Mesomedes Hymn to Nemesis showing an accent at the end of a clause

There are almost no examples in the music of an oxytone word at the end of a sentence except the following, where the same phrase is repeated at the end of a stanza. Here the pitch drops and the accent appears to be retracted to the penultimate syllable:

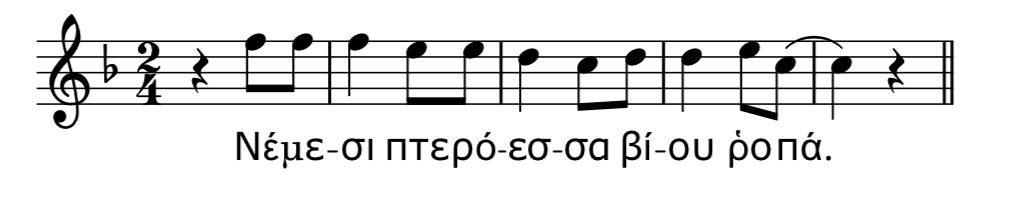
Phrase from Mesomedes' Hymn to Nemesis illustrating an oxytone word at the end of a sentence

This, however, contradicts the description of the ancient grammarians, according to whom a grave became an acute (implying that there was a rise in pitch) at the end of a sentence just as it does before a comma.

=== General intonation ===
Devine and Stephens also note that it is also possible to get some indication of the intonation of Ancient Greek from the Delphic hymns: For example, in most languages there is a tendency for the pitch to gradually become lower as the clause proceeds. This tendency, known as downtrend or downdrift, seems to have been characteristic of Greek too. For example, in the second line of the 1st Delphic Hymn, there is a gradual descent from a high pitch to a low one, followed by a jump up by an octave for the start of the next sentence. The words (mólete sunómaimon hína Phoîbon ōidaîsi mélpsēte khruseokóman) mean: 'Come, so that you may hymn with songs your brother Phoebus, the Golden-Haired':

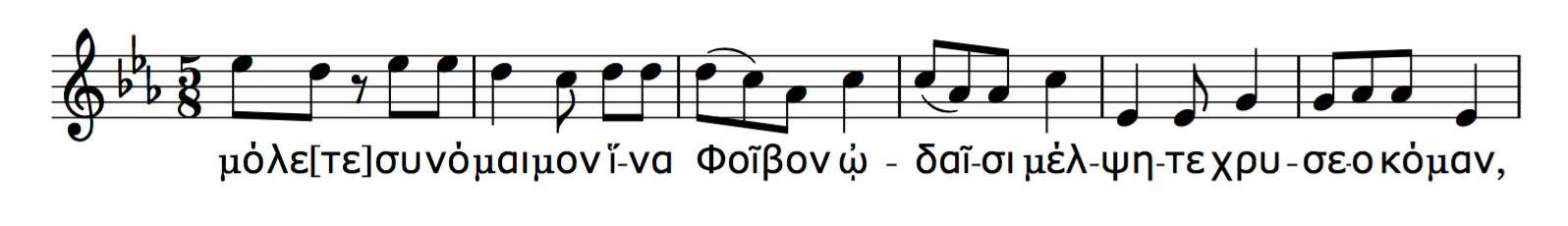
A line of music from the 1st Delphic Hymn, showing how the accents gradually descend in pitch in the course of the sentence. The words read: 'Come, so that you may hymn with songs your brother Phoebus, the Golden-Haired.'

However, not all sentences follow this rule, but some have an upwards trend, as in the clause below from the first Delphic hymn, which when restored reads τρίποδα μαντεῖον ὡς εἷλ[ες ὃν μέγας ἐ]φρούρει δράκων trípoda manteîon hōs heîl[es hòn mégas e]phroúrei drákōn 'how you seized the prophetic tripod which the great snake was guarding'. Here the whole sentence rises up to the emphatic word δράκων drákōn 'large serpent':

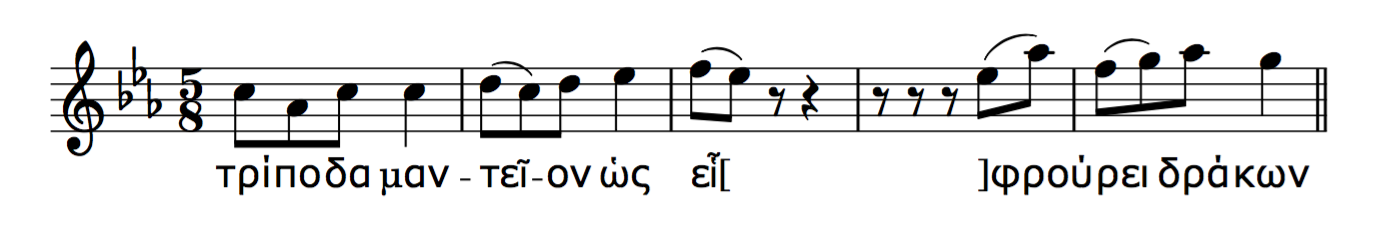
A sentence from the 1st Delphic hymn, illustrating a rising intonation

In English before a comma, the voice tends to remain raised, to indicate that the sentence is not finished, and this appears to be true of Greek also. Immediately before a comma, a circumflex accent does not fall but is regularly set to a level note, as in the first line of the Seikilos epitaph, which reads hòson zêis phaínou, mēdèn hólōs sù lupoû 'As long as you live, shine! Do not grieve at all':

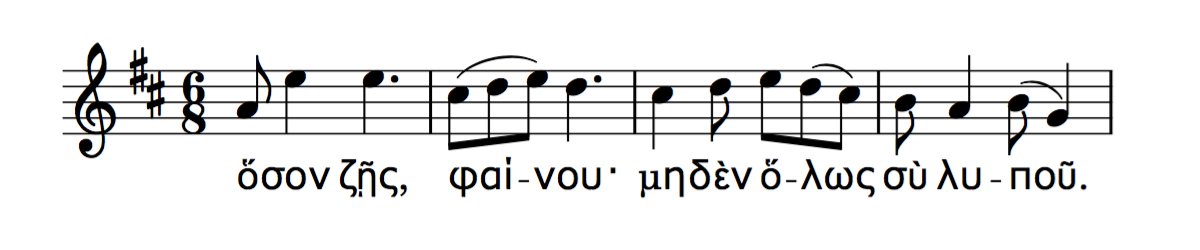
A transcription of the 1st half of the Seikilos epitaph

A higher pitch is also used for proper names and for emphatic words, especially in situations where a non-basic word-order indicates emphasis or focus. An example occurs in the second half of the Seikilos epitaph, where the last two lines read pròs olígon ésti tò zên, tò télos ho khrónos apaiteî 'It is for a short time only that life exists; as for the end, Time demands it'. In the second sentence, where the order is object–subject–verb, the word χρόνος khrónos 'time' has the highest pitch, as if emphasised:

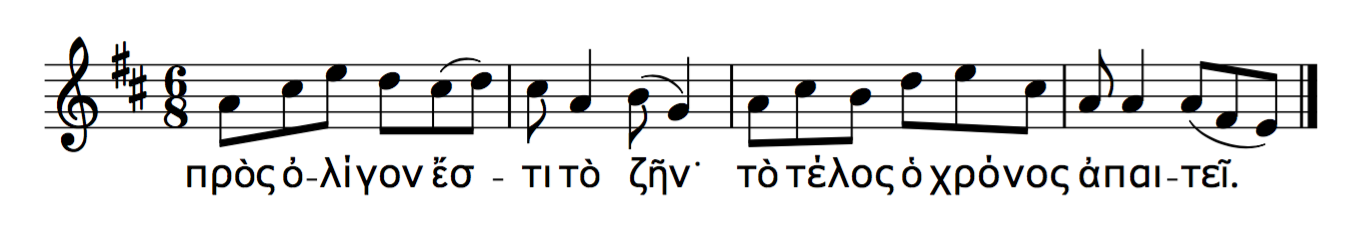
A transcription of the second half of the Seikilos epitaph

Another circumstance in which no downtrend is evident is when a non-lexical word is involved, such as ἵνα hína 'so that' or τόνδε tónde 'this'. In the music the accent in the word following non-lexical words is usually on the same pitch as the non-lexical accent, not lower than it. Thus there is no downtrend in phrases such as τόνδε πάγον tónde págon 'this crag' or ἵνα Φοῖβον hína Phoîbon 'so that Phoebus', where in each case the second word is more important than the first:

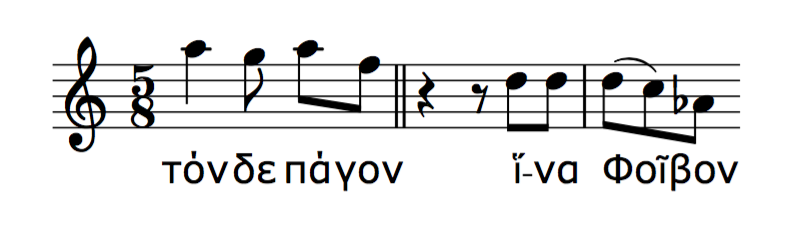
Phrases from Greek music showing lack of downtrend

Phrases containing a genitive, such as Λατοῦς γόνε Latoûs góne 'Leto's son' quoted above, or μῆρα ταύρων mêra taúrōn 'thighs of bulls' in the illustration below from the 1st Delphic hymn, also have no downdrift, but in both of these the second word is slightly higher than the first:

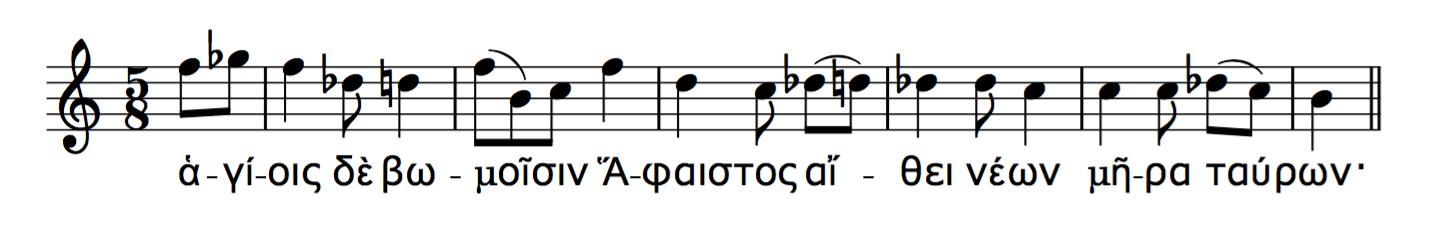
A sentence from the 1st Delphic hymn illustrating the way music imitates the accents of words

=== Strophe and antistrophe ===
One problem which has been discussed concerning the relationship between music and word accent is what may have happened in choral music which was written in pairs of corresponding stanzas known as strophe and antistrophe. Rhythmically these always correspond exactly but the word accents in the antistrophe generally do not match those in the strophe. Since none of the surviving music includes both a strophe and antistrophe, it is not clear whether the same music was written for both stanzas, ignoring the word accents in one or the other, or whether the music was similar but varied slightly to account for the accents. The following lines from Mesomedes' Hymn to the Sun, which are very similar but with slight variations in the first five notes, show how this might have been possible:

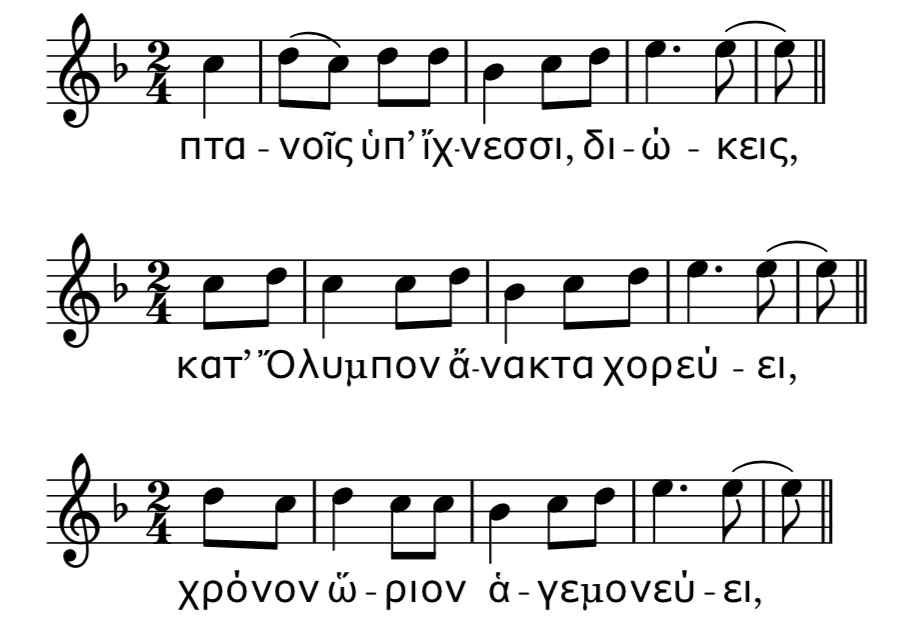
Three examples from Mesomedes' Hymn to the Sun showing how melodies match the word accents

== Change to modern Greek ==
In modern Greek the accent is for the most part in the same syllable of the words as it was in ancient Greek, but is one of stress rather than pitch, so that an accented syllable, such as the first syllable in the word ἄνθρωπος, can be pronounced sometimes on a high pitch, and sometimes on a low pitch. It is believed that this change took place around 2nd–4th century AD, at around the same time that the distinction between long and short vowels was also lost. One of the first writers to compose poetry based on a stress accent was the 4th-century Gregory of Nazianzus, who wrote two hymns in which syllable quantities play no part in the metre, but almost every line is accented on the penultimate syllable.

In modern Greek there is no difference in pronunciation between the former acute, grave, and circumflex accents, and in the modern "monotonic" spelling introduced in Greek schools in 1982 only one accent is used, the acute, while monosyllables are left unaccented.

== Rules for the placement of the accent ==
=== Law of limitation ===
The accent may not come more than three syllables from the end of a word.

If an accent comes on the antepenultimate syllable, it is always an acute, for example:

θάλασσα	thálassa	'sea'
ἐποίησαν	epoíēsan	'they did'
ἄνθρωπος	ánthrōpos	'person'
ἄνθρωποι	ánthrōpoi	'people'
βούλομαι	boúlomai	'I want'

Exception:

ὧντινων	hôntinōn	'of what sort of'

in which the second part is an enclitic word.

With a few exceptions, the accent can come on the antepenult only if the last syllable of the word is 'light'. The last syllable counts as light if it ends in a short vowel, or if it ends in a short vowel followed by no more than one consonant, or if the word ends in -οι -oi or -αι -ai, as in the above examples. But for words like the following, which have a heavy final syllable, the accent moves forward to the penultimate:

ἀνθρώπου	anthrṓpou	'of a man'
ἀνθρώποις	anthrṓpois	'for men'
ἐβουλόμην	eboulómēn	'I wanted'

The ending -ει -ei always counts as long, and in the optative mood, the endings -οι -oi or -αι -ai also count as long and cause the accent to move forward in the same way:

ποιήσει	poiḗsei	'he will do'
ποιήσοι	poiḗsoi	'he would do' (future optative)

The accent also cannot come on the antepenultimate syllable when the word ends in -ξ -x or -ψ -ps, hence the difference in pairs of words such as the following:

φιλόλογος	philólogos	'fond of words', but
φιλοκόλαξ	philokólax	'fond of flatterers'

Certain words ending in -ων -ōn or -ως -ōs are exceptions, when the accent may remain on the antepenult even when the last vowel is long; some examples:

πόλεως	póleōs	'of a city'
πόλεων	póleōn	'of cities' (genitive)

χρυσόκερως	khrusókerōs	'golden-horned'
ῥινόκερως	rhinókerōs	'rhinoceros'

ἵλεως	híleōs	'propitious'
Μενέλεως	Menéleōs	'Menelaus'

=== σωτῆρα (sōtêra) Law ===
If the accent comes on the penultimate syllable, it must be a circumflex if the last two vowels of the word are long–short. This applies even to words ending in -ξ -x or -ψ -ps:

- σῶμα sôma 'body'
- δοῦλος doûlos 'slave'
- κῆρυξ kêrux 'herald'
- λαῖλαψ laîlaps 'storm'

This rule is known as the σωτῆρα (sōtêra) Law, since in the accusative case the word σωτήρ sōtḗr 'saviour' becomes σωτῆρα sōtêra.

In most cases, a final -οι -oi or -αι -ai counts as a short vowel:

- ναῦται naûtai 'sailors'
- ποιῆσαι poiêsai 'to do'
- δοῦλοι doûloi 'slaves'

Otherwise the accent is an acute:

- ναύτης naútēs 'sailor'
- κελεύει keleúei 'he orders'
- δούλοις doúlois 'for slaves (dative)'

Exception 1: Certain compounds made from an ordinary word and an enclitic suffix have an acute even though they have long vowel–short vowel:

- οἵδε hoíde 'these', ἥδε hḗde 'this (fem.)' (but τῶνδε tônde 'of these')
- ὥστε hṓste 'that (as a result)', οὔτε oúte 'nor'
- εἴθε eíthe 'if only'
- οὔτις oútis 'no one' (but as a name in the Odyssey, Οὖτις Oûtis)

Exception 2: In locative expressions and verbs in the optative mood a final -οι -oi or -αι -ai counts as a long vowel:

- οἴκοι oíkoi 'at home' (cf. οἶκοι oîkoi 'houses')
- ποιήσαι poiḗsai 'he might do' (aorist optative, = ποιήσειε poiḗseie) (cf. ποιῆσαι poiêsai 'to do')

=== Law of Persistence ===
The third principle of Greek accentuation is that, after taking into account the Law of Limitation and the σωτῆρα (sōtêra) Law, the accent in nouns, adjectives, and pronouns remains as far as possible on the same syllable (counting from the beginning of the word) in all the cases, numbers, and genders. For example:

- ζυγόν zugón 'yoke', pl. ζυγά zugá 'yokes'
- στρατιώτης stratiṓtēs 'soldier', στρατιῶται stratiôtai 'soldiers'
- πατήρ patḗr, pl. πατέρες patéres 'fathers'
- σῶμα sôma, pl. σώματα sṓmata 'bodies'

But an extra syllable or a long ending causes accent shift:

- ὄνομα ónoma, pl. ὀνόματα onómata 'names'
- δίκαιος díkaios, fem. δικαίᾱ dikaíā 'just'
- σῶμα sôma, gen.pl. σωμάτων sōmátōn 'of bodies'

=== Exceptions to the Law of Persistence ===
There are a number of exceptions to the Law of Persistence.

Exception 1: The following words have the accent on a different syllable in the plural:

- ἀνήρ anḗr, pl. ἄνδρες ándres 'men'
- θυγάτηρ thugátēr, pl. θυγατέρες thugatéres (poetic θύγατρες thúgatres) 'daughters'
- μήτηρ mḗtēr, pl. μητέρες mētéres 'mothers'

The accusative singular and plural has the same accent as the nominative plural given above.

The name Δημήτηρ Dēmḗtēr 'Demeter' changes its accent to accusative Δήμητρα Dḗmētra, genitive Δήμητρος Dḗmētros, dative Δήμητρι Dḗmētri.

Exception 2: Certain vocatives (mainly of the 3rd declension) have recessive accent:

- Σωκράτης Sōkrátēs, ὦ Σώκρατες ô Sṓkrates 'o Socrates'
- πατήρ patḗr, ὦ πάτερ ô páter 'o father'

Exception 3: All 1st declension nouns, and all 3rd declension neuter nouns ending in -ος -os, have a genitive plural ending in -ῶν -ôn. This also applies to 1st declension adjectives, but only if the feminine genitive plural is different from the masculine:

- στρατιώτης stratiṓtēs 'soldier', gen.pl. στρατιωτῶν stratiōtôn 'of soldiers'
- τὸ τεῖχος tò teîkhos 'the wall', gen.pl. τῶν τειχῶν tôn teikhôn 'of the walls'

Exception 4: Some 3rd declension nouns, including all monosyllables, place the accent on the ending in the genitive and dative singular, dual, and plural. (This also applies to the adjective πᾶς pâs 'all' but only in the singular.) Further details are given below.

- πούς poús 'foot', acc.sg. πόδα póda, gen.sg. ποδός podós, dat.sg. ποδί podí

Exception 5: Some adjectives, but not all, move the accent to the antepenultimate when neuter:

- βελτίων beltíōn 'better', neuter βέλτιον béltion
- But: χαρίεις kharíeis 'graceful', neuter χαρίεν kharíen

Exception 6: The following adjective has an accent on the second syllable in the forms containing -αλ- -al-:

- μέγας mégas, pl. μεγάλοι megáloi 'big'

=== Oxytone words ===
Oxytone words, that is, words with an acute on the final syllable, have their own rules.

==== Change to a grave ====
Normally in a sentence, whenever an oxytone word is followed by a non-enclitic word, the acute is changed to a grave; but before a pause (such as a comma, colon, full stop, or verse end), it remains an acute:

- ἀνὴρ ἀγαθός anḕr agathós 'a good man'

(Not all editors follow the rule about verse end.)

The acute also remains before an enclitic word such as ἐστί estí 'is':

- ἀνὴρ ἀγαθός ἐστι anḕr agathós esti 'he's a good man'

In the words τίς; tís? 'who?' and τί; tí? 'what? why?', however, the accent always remains acute, even if another word follows:

- τίς οὗτος; tís hoûtos? 'who is that?'
- τί ποιεῖς; tí poieîs? 'what are you doing?'

==== Change to a circumflex ====
When a noun or adjective is used in different cases, a final acute often changes to a circumflex. In the 1st and 2nd declension, oxytone words change the accent to a circumflex in the genitive and dative. This also applies to the dual and plural, and to the definite article:

- ὁ θεός ho theós 'the god', acc.sg. τὸν θεόν tòn theón – gen. sg. τοῦ θεοῦ toû theoû 'of the god', dat.sg. τῷ θεῷ tôi theôi 'to the god'

However, oxytone words in the 'Attic' declension keep their acute in the genitive and dative:

- ἐν τῷ νεῴ en tôi neṓi 'in the temple'

3rd declension nouns like βασιλεύς basileús 'king' change the acute to a circumflex in the vocative and dative singular and nominative plural:

- βασιλεύς basileús, voc.sg. βασιλεῦ basileû, dat.sg. βασιλεῖ basileî, nom.pl. βασιλεῖς basileîs or βασιλῆς basilês

Adjectives of the type ἀληθής alēthḗs 'true' change the acute to a circumflex in all the cases which have a long vowel ending:

- ἀληθής alēthḗs, acc.sg. ἀληθῆ alēthê, gen.sg. ἀληθοῦς alēthoûs, dat.sg. ἀληθεῖ alētheî, nom./acc.pl. ἀληθεῖς alētheîs, gen.pl. ἀληθῶν alēthôn

Adjectives of the type ἡδύς hēdús 'pleasant' change the acute to a circumflex in the dative singular and nominative and accusative plural:

- ἡδύς hēdús, dat.sg. ἡδεῖ hēdeî, nom./acc.pl. ἡδεῖς hēdeîs

=== Accentless words ===
The following words have no accent, only a breathing:

- the forms of the article beginning with a vowel (ὁ, ἡ, οἱ, αἱ ho, hē, hoi, hai)
- the prepositions ἐν en 'in', εἰς (ἐς) eis (es) 'to, into', ἐξ (ἐκ) ex (ek) 'from'
- the conjunction εἰ ei 'if'
- the conjunction ὡς hōs 'as, that' (also a preposition 'to')
- the negative adverb οὐ (οὐκ, οὐχ) ou (ouk, oukh) 'not'.

However, some of these words can have an accent when they are used in emphatic position. ὁ, ἡ, οἱ, αἱ ho, hē, hoi, hai are written ὃ, ἣ, οἳ, αἳ when the meaning is 'who, which'; and οὐ ou is written οὔ if it ends a sentence.

=== The definite article ===
The definite article in the nominative singular and plural masculine and feminine just has a rough breathing, and no accent:

- ὁ θεός ho theós 'the god'
- οἱ θεοί hoi theoí 'the gods'

Otherwise the nominative and accusative have an acute accent, which in the context of a sentence, is written as a grave:

- τὸν θεόν tòn theón 'the god' (accusative)
- τὰ ὅπλα tà hópla 'the weapons'

The genitive and dative (singular, plural and dual), however, are accented with a circumflex:

- τῆς οἰκίας tês oikías 'of the house' (genitive)
- τῷ θεῷ tôi theôi 'for the god' (dative)
- τοῖς θεοῖς toîs theoîs 'for the gods' (dative plural)
- τοῖν θεοῖν toîn theoîn 'of/to the two goddesses' (genitive or dative dual)

1st and 2nd declension oxytones, such as θεός theós, are accented the same way as the article, with a circumflex in the genitive and dative.

=== Nouns ===
==== 1st declension ====
===== Types =====
Those ending in short -α -a are all recessive:

- θάλασσα thálassa 'sea', Μοῦσα Moûsa 'Muse (goddess of music)', βασίλεια basíleia 'queen', γέφυρα géphura 'bridge', ἀλήθεια alḗtheia 'truth', μάχαιρα mákhaira 'dagger', γλῶσσα glôssa 'tongue, language'

Of those which end in long -α -a or -η -ē, some have penultimate accent:

- οἰκία oikía 'house', χώρα khṓra 'country', νίκη níkē 'victory', μάχη mákhē 'battle', ἡμέρα hēméra 'day', τύχη túkhē 'chance', ἀνάγκη anánkē 'necessity', τέχνη tékhnē 'craft', εἰρήνη eirḗnē 'peace'

Others are oxytone:

- ἀγορά agorá 'market', στρατιά stratiá 'army', τιμή timḗ 'honour', ἀρχή arkhḗ 'empire; beginning', ἐπιστολή epistolḗ 'letter', κεφαλή kephalḗ 'head', ψυχή psukhḗ 'soul', βουλή boulḗ 'council'

A very few have a contracted ending with a circumflex on the last syllable:

- γῆ gê 'earth, land', Ἀθηνᾶ Athēnâ 'Athena', μνᾶ mnâ 'mina (coin)'

Masculine 1st declension nouns usually have penultimate accent:

- στρατιώτης stratiṓtēs 'soldier', πολίτης polítēs 'citizen', νεανίας neanías 'young man', ναύτης naútēs 'sailor', Πέρσης Pérsēs 'Persian', δεσπότης despótēs 'master', Ἀλκιβιάδης Alkibiádēs 'Alcibiades', Μιλτιάδης Miltiádēs 'Miltiades'

A few, especially agent nouns, are oxytone:

- ποιητής poiētḗs 'poet', κριτής kritḗs 'judge', μαθητής mathētḗs 'learner, disciple', ἀθλητής athlētḗs 'athlete', αὐλητής aulētḗs 'piper'

There are also some with a contracted final syllable:

- Ἑρμῆς Hermês 'Hermes', Βορρᾶς Borrhâs 'the North Wind'

===== Accent movement =====
In proparoxytone words like θάλασσα thálassa, with a short final vowel, the accent moves to the penultimate in the accusative plural, and in the genitive and dative singular, dual, and plural, when the final vowel becomes long:

- θάλασσα thálassa 'sea', gen. τῆς θαλάσσης tês thalássēs 'of the sea'

In words with penultimate accent, the accent is persistent, that is, as far as possible it stays on the same syllable when the noun changes case. But if the last two vowels are long–short, it changes to a circumflex:

- στρατιώτης stratiṓtēs 'soldier', nom.pl. οἱ στρατιῶται hoi stratiôtai 'the soldiers'

In oxytone words, the accent changes to a circumflex in the genitive and dative (also in the plural and dual), just as in the definite article:

- τῆς στρατιᾶς tês stratiâs 'of the army', τῇ στρατιᾷ têi stratiâi 'for the army'

All 1st declension nouns have a circumflex on the final syllable in the genitive plural:

- στρατιωτῶν stratiōtôn 'of soldiers', ἡμερῶν hēmerôn 'of days'

The vocative of 1st declension nouns usually has the accent on the same syllable as the nominative. But the word δεσπότης despótēs 'master' has a vocative accented on the first syllable:

- ὦ νεανία ô neanía 'young man!', ὦ ποιητά ô poiētá 'o poet'
- ὦ δέσποτα ô déspota 'master!'

==== 2nd declension ====
===== Types =====
The majority of 2nd declension nouns have recessive accent, but there are a few oxytones, and a very few with an accent in between (neither recessive nor oxytone) or contracted:

- ἄνθρωπος ánthrōpos 'man', ἵππος híppos 'horse', πόλεμος pólemos 'war', νῆσος nêsos 'island', δοῦλος doûlos 'slave', λόγος lógos 'wοrd', θάνατος thánatos 'death', βίος bíos 'life', ἥλιος hḗlios 'sun', χρόνος khrónos 'time', τρόπος trópos 'manner', νόμος nómos 'law, custom', θόρυβος thórubos 'noise', κύκλος kúklos 'circle'
- θεός theós 'god', ποταμός potamós 'river', ὁδός hodós 'road', ἀδελφός adelphós 'brother', ἀριθμός arithmós 'number', στρατηγός stratēgós 'general', ὀφθαλμός ophthalmós 'eye', οὐρανός ouranós 'heaven', υἱός huiós 'son', τροχός trokhós 'wheel'
- παρθένος parthénos 'maiden', νεανίσκος neanískos 'youth', ἐχῖνος ekhînos 'hedgehog; sea-urchin'
- νοῦς noûs 'mind' (contracted from νόος), πλοῦς ploûs 'voyage'

Words of the 'Attic' declension ending in -ως -ōs can also be either recessive or oxytone:

- Μενέλεως Menéleōs 'Menelaus', Μίνως Mínōs 'Minos'
- νεώς neṓs 'temple', λεώς leṓs 'people'

Neuter words are mostly recessive, but not all:

- δῶρον dôron 'gift', δένδρον déndron 'tree', ὅπλα hópla 'weapons', στρατόπεδον stratópedon 'camp', πλοῖον ploîon 'boat', ἔργον érgon 'work', τέκνον téknon 'child', ζῷον zôion 'animal'
- σημεῖον sēmeîon 'sign', μαντεῖον manteîon 'oracle', διδασκαλεῖον didaskaleîon 'school'
- ζυγόν zugón 'yoke', ᾠόν ōión 'egg', ναυτικόν nautikón 'fleet', ἱερόν hierón 'temple' (the last two are derived from adjectives)

Words ending in -ιον -ion often have penultimate accent, especially diminutive words:

- βιβλίον biblíon 'book', χωρίον khōríon 'place', παιδίον paidíon 'baby', πεδίον pedíon 'plain'

But some -ιον -ion words are recessive, especially those with a short antepenultimate:

- ἱμάτιον himátion 'cloak', στάδιον stádion 'stade' (600 feet), 'race-course', μειράκιον meirákion 'lad'

===== Accent movement =====
As with the first declension, the accent on 2nd declension oxytone nouns such as θεός theós 'god' changes to a circumflex in the genitive and dative (singular, dual, and plural):

- τοῦ θεοῦ toû theoû 'of the god', τοῖς θεοῖς toîs theoîs 'to the gods'

But those in the Attic declension retain their acute:

- τοῦ λεώ toû leṓ 'of the people'

Unlike in the first declension, barytone words do not have a circumflex in the genitive plural:

- τῶν ἵππων tôn híppōn 'of the horses'

==== 3rd declension ====
===== Types =====
3rd declension masculine and feminine nouns can be recessive or oxytone:

- μήτηρ mḗtēr 'mother', θυγάτηρ thugátēr 'daughter', φύλαξ phúlax 'guard', πόλις pólis 'city', γέρων gérōn 'old man', λέων léōn 'lion', δαίμων daímōn 'god', τριήρης triḗrēs 'trireme (warship)', μάρτυς mártus 'witness', μάντις mántis 'seer', τάξις táxis 'arrangement', Ἕλληνες Héllēnes 'Greeks', Πλάτων Plátōn 'Plato', Σόλων Sólōn 'Solon', Δημοσθένης Dēmosthénēs
- πατήρ patḗr 'father', ἀνήρ anḗr 'man', γυνή gunḗ 'woman', βασιλεύς basileús 'king', ἱππεύς hippeús 'cavalryman', χειμών kheimṓn 'storm, winter', ἐλπίς elpís 'hope', Ἑλλάς Hellás 'Greece', ἰχθύς ikhthús 'fish', πατρίς patrís 'fatherland', ἀγών agṓn 'contest', λιμήν limḗn 'harbour', χιών khiṓn 'snow', χιτών khitṓn 'tunic', ὀδούς odoús 'tooth', ἀσπίς aspís 'shield', δελφίς delphís 'dolphin', Ἀμαζών Amazṓn 'Amazon', Ὀδυσσεύς Odusseús 'Odysseus', Σαλαμίς Salamís 'Salamis', Μαραθών Marathṓn 'Marathon'

Certain names resulting from a contraction are perispomenon:

- Ξενοφῶν Xenophôn, Περικλῆς Periklês, Ποσειδῶν Poseidôn, Ἡρακλῆς Hēraklês, Σοφοκλῆς Sophoklês

Masculine and feminine monosyllables similarly can be recessive (with a circumflex) or oxytone (with an acute):

- παῖς paîs 'boy', ναῦς naûs 'ship', βοῦς boûs 'ox', γραῦς graûs 'old woman', ὗς hûs 'pig', οἶς oîs 'sheep'
- χείρ kheír 'hand', πούς poús 'foot', νύξ núx 'night', Ζεύς Zeús 'Zeus', χθών khthṓn 'earth', μήν mḗn 'month', Πάν Pán 'Pan', χήν khḗn 'goose', αἴξ aíx 'goat'

3rd declension neuter nouns are all recessive, and monosyllables have a circumflex (this includes letters of the alphabet):

- ὄνομα ónoma 'name', σῶμα sôma 'body', στόμα stóma 'mouth', τεῖχος teîkhos 'wall', ὄρος óros 'mountain', ἔτος étos 'year', αἷμα haîma 'blood', ὔδωρ húdōr 'water', γένος génos 'race, kind', χρήματα khrḗmata 'money', πρᾶγμα prâgma 'business, affair', πνεῦμα pneûma 'spirit, breath', τέλος télos 'end'
- πῦρ pûr 'fire', φῶς phôs 'light', κῆρ kêr 'heart' (poetic)
- μῦ mû, φῖ phî, ὦ ô 'omega'

===== Accent movement =====
The accent in the nominative plural and in the accusative singular and plural is usually on the same syllable as the nominative singular, unless this would break the three-syllable rule. Thus:

- χειμών kheimṓn, pl. χειμῶνες kheimônes 'storms'
- γυνή gunḗ, pl. γυναῖκες gunaîkes 'women'
- πατήρ patḗr, pl. πατέρες patéres 'fathers'
- ναῦς naûs, pl. νῆες nêes 'ships'
- σῶμα sôma, pl. σώματα sṓmata 'bodies'

But, in accordance with the 3-syllable rule:

- ὄνομα ónoma, nominative pl. ὀνόματα onómata 'names', gen. pl. ὀνομάτων onomátōn

The following are exceptions and have the accent on a different syllable in the nominative and accusative plural or the accusative singular:

- ἀνήρ anḗr, pl. ἄνδρες ándres 'men'
- θυγάτηρ thugátēr, pl. θυγατέρες thugatéres (poetic θύγατρες thúgatres) 'daughters'
- μήτηρ mḗtēr, pl. μητέρες mētéres 'mothers'

But the following is recessive:

- Δημήτηρ Dēmḗtēr, acc. Δήμητρα Dḗmētra 'Demeter'

Words ending in -ευς -eus are all oxytone, but only in the nominative singular. In all other cases the accent is on the ε e or η ē:

- βασιλεύς, βασιλέα, βασιλέως, βασιλεῖ basileús, basiléa, basiléōs, basileî 'king', nom.pl. βασιλῆς basilês or βασιλεῖς basileîs

===== Accent shift in genitive and dative =====
In 3rd declension monosyllables the accent usually shifts to the final syllable in the genitive and dative. The genitive dual and plural have a circumflex:

- singular: πούς, πόδα, ποδός, ποδί poús, póda, podós, podí 'foot'
  dual: nom./acc. πόδε póde, gen./dat. ποδοῖν podoîn '(pair of) feet'
  plural: πόδες, πόδας, ποδῶν, ποσί(ν) pódes, pódas, podôn, posí(n) 'feet'
- singular: νύξ, νύκτα, νυκτός, νυκτί núx, núkta, nuktós, nuktí 'night'
  plural: νύκτες, νύκτας, νυκτῶν, νυξί(ν)

The following are irregular in formation, but the accent moves in the same way:

- ναῦς, ναῦν, νεώς, νηΐ naûs, naûn, neṓs, nēḯ} 'ship'
  plural: νῆες, νῆας, νεῶν, νηυσί(ν) nêes, nêas, neôn, nēusí(n)
- Ζεύς, Δία, Διός, Διΐ Zeús, Día, Diós, Diḯ 'Zeus'

The numbers for 'one', 'two', and 'three' also follow this pattern (see below).

γυνή gunḗ 'woman' and κύων kúōn 'dog' despite not being monosyllables, follow the same pattern:

- γυνή, γυναῖκα, γυναικός, γυναικί, γύναι! gunḗ, gunaîka, gunaikós, gunaikí, gúnai! 'woman'
  pl. γυναῖκες, γυναῖκας, γυναικῶν, γυναιξί(ν) gunaîkes, gunaîkas, gunaikôn, gunaixí(n)
- κύων, κύνα, κυνός, κυνί kúōn, kúna, kunós, kuní 'dog'
  pl. κύνες, κύνας, κυνῶν, κυσί(ν) kúnes, kúnas, kunôn, kusí(n)

There are some irregularities. The nouns παῖς paîs 'boy' and Τρῶες Trôes 'Trojans' follow this pattern except in the genitive dual and plural:

- singular παῖς, παῖδα, παιδός, παιδί paîs, paîda, paidós, paidí 'boy'
  παῖδες, παῖδας, παίδων, παισί(ν) paîdes, paîdas, paídōn, paisí(n)

The adjective πᾶς pâs 'all' has a mobile accent only in the singular:

- singular πᾶς, πάντα, παντός, παντί pâs, pánta, pantós, pantí

plural πάντες, πάντας, πάντων, πᾶσι(ν) pántes, pántas, pántōn, pâsi(n).

Monosyllabic participles, such as ὤν ṓn 'being', and the interrogative pronoun τίς; τί; tís? tí? 'who? what?' have a fixed accent.

- singular ὤν, ὄντα, ὄντος, ὄντι ṓn, ónta, óntos, ónti

plural ὄντες, ὄντας, ὄντων, οὖσι(ν) óntes, óntas, óntōn, oûsi(n).

The words πατήρ patḗr 'father', μήτηρ mḗtēr 'mother', θυγάτηρ thugátēr 'daughter', have the following accentuation:

- πατήρ, πατέρα, πατρός, πατρί, πάτερ! patḗr, patéra, patrós, patrí, páter! 'father'
  pl. πατέρες, πατέρας, πατέρων, πατράσι(ν) patéres, patéras, patérōn, patrási(n)

γαστήρ gastḗr 'stomach' is similar:

- γαστήρ, γαστέρα, γαστρός, γαστρί gastḗr, gastéra, gastrós, gastrí 'stomach'
  pl. γαστέρες, γαστέρας, γάστρων, γαστράσι(ν) gastéres, gastéras, gástrōn, gastrási(n)}

The word ἀνήρ anḗr 'man' has the following pattern, with accent shift in the genitive singular and plural:

- ἀνήρ, ἄνδρα, ἀνδρός, ἀνδρί anḗr, ándra, andrós, andrí 'man'
  pl. ἄνδρες, ἄνδρας, ἀνδρῶν, ἀνδράσι(ν) ándres, ándras, andrôn, andrási(n)

3rd declension neuter words ending in -ος -os have a circumflex in the genitive plural, but are otherwise recessive:

- τεῖχος teîkhos 'wall', gen.pl. τειχῶν teikhôn 'of walls'

Concerning the genitive plural of the word τριήρης triḗrēs 'trireme', there was uncertainty. 'Some people pronounce it barytone, others perispomenon,' wrote one grammarian.

Nouns such as πόλις pólis 'city' and ἄστυ ástu 'town' with genitive singular -εως -eōs 'city' keep their accent on the first syllable in the genitive singular and plural, despite the long vowel ending:

- πόλις, πόλιν, πόλεως, πόλει pólis, pólin, póleōs, pólei 'city'
  pl. πόλεις, πόλεις, πόλεων, πόλεσι(ν) póleis, póleis, póleōn, pólesi(n)

3rd declension neuter nouns ending in -ος -os have a circumflex in the genitive plural, but are otherwise recessive:

- τεῖχος, τεῖχος, τείχους, τείχει teîkhos, teîkhos, teíkhous, teíkhei 'wall'
  pl. τείχη, τείχη, τειχῶν, τείχεσι(ν) teíkhē, teíkhē, teikhôn, teíkhesi(n)

===== Vocative =====
Usually in 3rd declension nouns the accent becomes recessive in the vocative:

- πάτερ páter 'father!', γύναι gúnai 'madam!', ὦ Σώκρατες ô Sṓkrates 'o Socrates', Πόσειδον Póseidon, Ἄπολλον Ápollon, Περίκλεις Períkleis

However, the following have a circumflex on the final syllable:

- ὦ Ζεῦ ô Zeû 'o Zeus', ὦ βασιλεῦ ô basileû 'o king'

=== Adjectives ===
==== Types ====
Adjectives frequently have oxytone accentuation, but there are also barytone ones, and some with a contracted final syllable. Oxytone examples are:

- ἀγαθός agathós 'good', κακός kakós 'bad', καλός kalós 'beautiful', δεινός deinós 'fearsome', Ἑλληνικός Hellēnikós 'Greek', σοφός sophós 'wise', ἰσχυρός iskhurós 'strong', μακρός makrós 'long', αἰσχρός aiskhrós 'shameful', ὑψηλός hupsēlós 'high', μικρός mikrós 'small', πιστός pistós 'faithful', χαλεπός khalepós 'difficult'
- ἀριστερός aristerós 'left-hand', δεξιτερός dexiterós 'right-hand'
- ἡδύς hēdús 'pleasant', ὀξύς oxús 'sharp, high-pitched', βαρύς barús 'heavy, low-pitched', ταχύς takhús 'fast', βραδύς bradús 'slow', βαθύς bathús 'deep', γλυκύς glukús 'sweet'. (The feminine of all of these has -εῖα -eîa.)
- πολύς polús 'much', plural πολλοί polloí 'many'
- ἀληθής alēthḗs 'true', εὐτυχής eutukhḗs 'lucky', δυστυχής dustukhḗs 'unfortunate', ἀσθενής asthenḗs 'weak, sick', ἀσφαλής asphalḗs 'safe'

Recessive:

- φίλιος phílios 'friendly', πολέμιος polémios 'enemy', δίκαιος díkaios 'just', πλούσιος ploúsios 'rich', ἄξιος áxios 'worthy', Λακεδαιμόνιος Lakedaimónios 'Spartan', ῥᾴδιος rhā́idios 'easy'
- μῶρος môros 'foolish', ἄδικος ádikos 'unjust', νέος néos 'new, young', μόνος mónos 'alone', χρήσιμος khrḗsimos 'useful', λίθινος líthinos 'made of stone', ξύλινος xúlinos 'wooden'
- ἄλλος állos 'other', ἕκαστος hékastos 'each'
- ὑμέτερος huméteros 'your', ἡμέτερος hēméteros 'our'
- ἵλεως híleōs 'propitious'
- εὐμένης euménēs 'kindly', δυσώδης dusṓdēs 'bad-smelling', εὐδαίμων eudaímōn 'happy'. (For other compound adjectives, see below.)
- πᾶς, πᾶσα, πᾶν pâs, pâsa, pân 'all', plural πάντες pántes

Paroxytone:

- ὀλίγος olígos 'little', ἐναντίος enantíos 'opposite', πλησίος plēsíos 'near'
- μέγας mégas 'great, big', fem. μεγάλη megálē, plural μεγάλοι megáloi

Properispomenon:

- Ἀθηναῖος Athēnaîos 'Athenian', ἀνδρεῖος andreîos 'brave'
- ἑτοῖμος/ἕτοιμος hetoîmos/hétoimos 'ready', ἐρῆμος/ἔρημος erêmos/érēmos 'deserted'
- τοιοῦτος toioûtos 'such', τοσοῦτος tosoûtos 'so great'

Perispomenon:

- χρυσοῦς khrusoûs 'golden', χαλκοῦς khalkoûs 'bronze'

Comparative and superlative adjectives all have recessive accent:

- σοφώτερος sophṓteros 'wiser', σοφώτατος sophṓtatos 'very wise'
- μείζων meízōn 'greater', μέγιστος mégistos 'very great'

Adjectives ending in -ής -ḗs have a circumflex in most of the endings, since these are contracted:

- ἀληθής alēthḗs 'true', masculine plural ἀληθεῖς alētheîs

μῶρος môros 'foolish' is oxytone in the New Testament:

- πέντε δὲ ἐξ αὐτῶν ἦσαν μωραί pénte dè ex autôn êsan mōraí 'and five of them were foolish' (Matthew 25.2)

Personal names derived from adjectives are usually recessive, even if the adjective is not:

- Ἀθήναιος Athḗnaios 'Athenaeus', from Ἀθηναῖος Athēnaîos 'Athenian'
- Γλαῦκος Glaûkos, from γλαυκός glaukós 'grey-eyed'

==== Accent movement ====
Unlike in modern Greek, which has fixed accent in adjectives, an antepenultimate accent moves forward when the last vowel is long:

- φίλιος phílios 'friendly (masc.)', φιλίᾱ philíā 'friendly (fem.)', fem.pl. φίλιαι phíliai

The genitive plural of feminine adjectives is accented -ῶν -ôn, but only in those adjectives where the masculine and feminine forms of the genitive plural are different:

- πᾶς pâs 'all', gen.pl. πάντων pántōn 'of all (masc.)', πασῶν pasôn 'of all (fem.)'

But:

- δίκαιος díkaios 'just', gen.pl. δικαίων dikaíōn (both genders)

In a barytone adjective, in the neuter, when the last vowel becomes short, the accent usually recedes:

- βελτίων beltíōn 'better', neuter βέλτιον béltion

However, when the final -ν -n was formerly *-ντ -nt, the accent does not recede (this includes neuter participles):

- χαρίεις kharíeis 'graceful', neuter χαρίεν kharíen
- ποιήσας poiḗsas 'having done', neuter ποιῆσαν poiêsan

The adjective μέγας mégas 'great' shifts its accent to the penultimate in forms of the word that contain lambda (λ l):

- μέγας mégas 'great', plural μεγάλοι megáloi

The masculine πᾶς pâs 'all' and neuter πᾶν pân have their accent on the ending in genitive and dative, but only in the singular:

- πᾶς pâs 'all', gen.sg. παντός pantós, dat.sg. παντί pantí (but gen.pl. πάντων pántōn, dat.pl. πᾶσι pâsi)

The participle ὤν ṓn 'being', genitive ὄντος óntos, has fixed accent.

==== Elided vowels ====
When the last vowel of an oxytone adjective is elided, an acute (not a circumflex) appears on the penultimate syllable instead:

- δείν' ἐποίει deín' epoíei 'he was doing dreadful things' (for δεινά)
- πόλλ' ἀγαθά póll' agathá 'many good things' (for πολλά)

This rule also applies to verbs and nouns:

- λάβ' ὦ ξένε láb' ô xéne 'take (the cup), o stranger' (for λαβέ)

But it does not apply to minor words such as prepositions or ἀλλά allá 'but':

- πόλλ' οἶδ' ἀλώπηξ, ἀλλ' ἐχῖνος ἓν μέγα póll' oîd' alṓpēx, all' ekhînos hèn méga
  'the fox knows many things, but the hedgehog one big thing' (Archilochus)

The retracted accent was always an acute. The story was told of an actor who, in a performance of Euripides' play Orestes, instead of pronouncing γαλήν᾽ ὁρῶ galḗn᾽ horô 'I see a calm sea', accidentally said γαλῆν ὁρῶ galên horô 'I see a weasel', provoking laughter in the audience and mockery the following year in Aristophanes' Frogs.

=== Compound nouns and adjectives ===
Ordinary compounds, that is, those which are not of the type 'object+verb', usually have recessive accent:

- ἱπποπόταμος hippopótamos 'hippopotamus' ('horse of the river')
- Τιμόθεος Timótheos 'Timothy' ('honouring God')
- σύμμαχος súmmakhos 'ally' ('fighting alongside')
- φιλόσοφος philósophos 'philosopher' ('loving wisdom')
- ἡμίονος hēmíonos 'mule' ('half-donkey')

But there are some which are oxytone:

- ἀρχιερεύς arkhiereús 'high priest'
- ὑποκριτής hupokritḗs 'actor, hypocrite'

Compounds of the type 'object–verb', if the penultimate syllable is long or heavy, are usually oxytone:

- στρατηγός stratēgós 'general' ('army-leader')
- γεωργός geōrgós 'farmer' ('land-worker')
- σιτοποιός sitopoiós 'bread-maker'

But 1st declension nouns tend to be recessive even when the penultimate is long:

- βιβλιοπώλης bibliopṓlēs 'book-seller'
- συκοφάντης sukophántēs 'informer' (lit. 'fig-revealer')

Compounds of the type 'object+verb' when the penultimate syllable is short are usually paroxytone:

- βουκόλος boukólos 'cowherd'
- δορυφόρος doruphóros 'spear-bearer'
- δισκοβόλος diskobólos 'discus-thrower'
- ἡμεροσκόπος hēmeroskópos 'look-out man' (lit. 'day-watcher')

But the following, formed from ἔχω ékhō 'I hold', are recessive:

- αἰγίοχος aigíokhos 'who holds the aegis'
- κληροῦχος klēroûkhos 'holder of an allotment (of land)'

=== Adverbs ===
Adverbs formed from barytone adjectives are accented on the penultimate, as are those formed from adjectives ending in -ύς -ús; but those formed from other oxytone adjectives are perispomenon:

- ἀνδρεῖος andreîos 'brave', ἀνδρείως andreíōs 'bravely'
- δίκαιος díkaios 'just', δικαίως dikaíōs 'justly'
- ἡδύς hēdús, 'pleasant', ἡδέως hēdéōs 'with pleasure'
- καλός kalós, 'beautiful', καλῶς kalôs 'beautifully'
- ἀληθής alēthḗs, 'true', ἀληθῶς alēthôs 'truly'

Adverbs ending in -κις -kis have penultimate accent:

- πολλάκις pollákis 'often'

=== Numbers ===
The first three numbers have mobile accent in the genitive and dative:

- εἷς heîs 'one (m.)', acc. ἕνα héna, gen. ἑνός henós 'of one', dat. ἑνί hení 'to or for one'
- μία mía 'one (f.)', acc. μίαν mían, gen. μιᾶς miâs, dat. μιᾷ miâi
- δύο dúo 'two', gen/dat. δυοῖν duoîn
- τρεῖς treîs 'three', gen. τριῶν triôn, dat. τρισί trisí

Despite the circumflex in εἷς heîs, the negative οὐδείς oudeís 'no one (m.)' has an acute. It also has mobile accent in the genitive and dative:

- οὐδείς oudeís 'no one (m.)', acc. οὐδένα oudéna, gen. οὐδενός oudenós 'of no one', dat. οὐδενί oudení 'to no one'

The remaining numbers to twelve are:

- τέσσαρες téssares 'four', πέντε pénte 'five', ἕξ héx 'six', ἐπτά eptá 'seven', ὀκτώ oktṓ 'eight', ἐννέα ennéa 'nine', δέκα déka 'ten', ἕνδεκα héndeka 'eleven' δώδεκα dṓdeka 'twelve'

Also commonly found are:

- εἴκοσι eíkosi 'twenty', τριάκοντα triákonta 'thirty', ἑκατόν hekatón 'a hundred', χίλιοι khílioi 'a thousand'.

Ordinals all have recessive accent, except those ending in -στός -stós:

- πρῶτος prṓtos 'first', δεύτερος deúteros 'second', τρίτος trítos 'third' etc., but εἰκοστός eikostós 'twentieth'

=== Pronouns ===
The personal pronouns are the following:

- ἐγώ egṓ 'I', σύ sú 'you (sg.)', ἕ hé 'him(self)'
- νῴ nṓi 'we two', σφώ sphṓ 'you two'
- ἡμεῖς hēmeîs 'we', ὑμεῖς humeîs 'you (pl.)', σφεῖς spheîs 'they'

The genitive and dative of all these personal pronouns has a circumflex, except for the datives ἐμοί emoí, σοί soí, and σφίσι sphísi:

- ἐμοῦ emoû 'of me', ὑμῖν humîn 'for you (pl.)', οἷ hoî 'to him(self)'
- ἐμοί emoí 'for me', σοί soí 'for you', and σφίσι sphísi 'for them(selves)'

The oblique cases of ἐγώ egṓ, σύ sú 'you (sg.)', ἕ hé, and σφεῖς spheîs can also be used enclitically when they are unemphatic (see below under Enclitics), in which case they are written without accents. When enclitic, ἐμέ emé, ἐμοῦ emoû, and ἐμοί emoí are shortened to με me, μου mou, and μοι moi:

- ἔξεστί σοι éxestí soi 'it is possible for you'
- εἰπέ μοι eipé moi 'tell me'
- νόμος γὰρ ἦν οὗτός σφισι nómos gàr ên hoûtós sphisi 'for this apparently was their custom' (Xenophon)

The accented form is usually used after a preposition:

- ἔπεμψέ με Κῦρος πρὸς σέ épempsé me Kûros pròs sé 'Cyrus sent me to you'
- πρὸς ἐμέ pròs emé (sometimes πρός με prós me) 'to me'

The pronouns αὐτός autós 'he himself', ἑαυτόν heautón 'himself (reflexive)', and ὅς hós 'who, which' change the accent to a circumflex in the genitive and dative:

- αὐτόν autón 'him', αὐτοῦ autoû 'of him, his', αὐτῷ autôi 'to him', αὐτοῖς autoîs 'to them', etc.

Pronouns compounded with -δε -de 'this' and -τις -tis are accented as if the second part was an enclitic word. Thus the accent of οἵδε hoíde does not change to a circumflex even though the vowels are long–short:

- οἵδε hoíde 'these', ὧντινων hôntinōn 'of which things'

The demonstratives οὗτος hoûtos 'this' and ἐκεῖνος ekeînos 'that' are both accented on the penultimate syllable. But οὑτοσί houtosí 'this man here' is oxytone.

When τίς tís means 'who?' is it always accented, even when not before a pause. When it means 'someone' or 'a certain', it is enclitic (see below under Enclitics):

- πρός τινα prós tina 'to someone'
- πρὸς τίνα; pròs tína? 'to whom?'

The accent on τίς tís is fixed and does not move to the ending in the genitive or dative.

=== Prepositions ===
ἐν en 'in', εἰς (ἐς) eis (es) 'to, into', and ἐκ (ἐξ) ek (ex) 'from, out of' have no accent, only a breathing.

- ἐν αὐτῷ en autôi 'in him'

Most other prepositions have an acute on the final when quoted in isolation (e.g. ἀπό apó 'from', but in the context of a sentence this becomes a grave. When elided this accent does not retract and it is presumed that they were usually pronounced accentlessly:

- πρὸς αὐτόν pròs autón 'to him'
- ἀπ᾽ αὐτοῦ ap᾽ autoû 'from him'

When a preposition follows its noun, it is accented on the first syllable (except for ἀμφί amphí 'around' and ἀντί antí 'instead of'):

- τίνος πέρι; tínos péri? 'about what?'

The following prepositions were always accented on the first syllable in every context:

- ἄνευ áneu 'without', μέχρι mékhri 'until, as far as'

=== Interrogative words ===
Interrogative words are almost all accented recessively. In accordance with the principle that in a monosyllable the equivalent of a recessive accent is a circumflex, a circumflex is used on a long-vowel monosyllable:

- πότε; póte? 'when?', πόθεν; póthen? 'where from?', πότερον... ἢ...; póteron... ḕ...? 'A... or B?', ποῖος; poîos? 'what kind of?', πόσος; pósos? 'how much?', πόσοι; pósoi? 'how many?'
- ἆρα...; âra...?, ἦ...; ê...? 'is it the case that...?'
- ποῦ; poû? 'where?', ποῖ; poî? 'where to?', πῇ; pêi? 'which way?'

Two exceptions, with paroxytone accent, are the following:

- πηλίκος; pēlíkos? 'how big?', 'how old?', ποσάκις; posákis? 'how often?'

The words τίς; tís? and τί; tí? always keep their acute accent even when followed by another word. Unlike other monosyllables, they do not move the accent to the ending in the genitive or dative:

- τίς; tís? 'who? which?', τί; tí? 'what?', 'why?', τίνες; tínes? 'which people?', τίνος; tínos? 'of what? whose?', τίνι; tíni? 'to whom?', τίνος πέρι; tínos péri? 'about what?'

Some of these words, when accentless or accented on the final, have an indefinite meaning:

- τις tis 'someone', τινὲς tinès 'some people', ποτε pote 'once upon a time', etc.

When used in indirect questions, interrogative words are usually prefixed by ὁ- ho- or ὅς- hós-. The accentuation differs. The following are accented on the second syllable:

- ὁπότε hopóte 'when', ὁπόθεν hopóthen 'from where', ὁπόσος hopósos 'how great', ὁπότερος hopóteros 'which of the two'

But the following are accented on the first:

- ὅπου hópou 'where', ὅποι hópoi 'to where', ὅστις hóstis 'who'

=== Enclitics ===
==== Types of enclitic ====
Enclitics are words which have no accent themselves, but place an accent on the word they follow. Examples in Greek are the following:

(a) The connective τε te 'also', 'and':

- Ἕλληνές τε καὶ βάρβαροι Héllēnés te kaì bárbaroi 'both Greeks and foreigners'

(b) The emphatic particles:

- γε ge 'at any rate', περ per 'just, although', τοι toi 'in fact',
- (Mostly in Homer:) κε/κεν ke/ken 'it may be', νυ/νυν nu/nun 'now', ῥα rha 'then', θην thēn 'in truth':

The pronouns ἐγώ egṓ 'I' and ἐμοί emoí 'to me' can combine with γε ge to make a single word accented on the first syllable:

- ἔγωγε égōge 'I at any rate', ἔμοιγε émoige 'for me at any rate'

(c) Indefinite adverbs:

- ποτε pote 'once', πως pōs 'somehow', που pou 'I suppose, somewhere', ποθι pothi (Homeric for που), ποθεν pothen 'from somewhere', πῃ pēi 'in some way', πω pō 'yet'

(d) Indefinite pronouns:

- τις tis 'someone', 'a certain', τι ti 'something', τινες tines 'certain people'

But τινές tinés can also sometimes begin a sentence, in which case it is non-enclitic and has an accent on the final.

(e) The present tense (except for the 2nd person singular) of εἰμί eimí 'I am' and φημί phēmí 'I say':

- ἐγώ εἰμι egṓ eimi 'I am'
- ὡς αὐτός φησι hōs autós phēsi 'as he himself says'

These verbs can also have non-enclitic forms which are used, for example, to begin a sentence or after an elision. The verb ἐστὶ estì 'is' has an emphatic form ἔστι ésti. Judging from parallel forms in Sanskrit it is possible that originally when non-enclitic the other persons also were accented on the first syllable: *εἶμι eîmi, *φῆμι phêmi etc.; but the usual convention, among most modern editors as well as the ancient Greek grammarians, is to write εἰμὶ eimì and φημὶ phēmì even at the beginning of a sentence.

When negative, ἔστι ésti is customarily written with its strong form, but φησί phēsí is enclitic:

- οὐκ ἔστι ouk ésti 'he is not'
- οὔ φησι oú phēsi 'he says ... not'

The strong form ἔστι ésti is also written after εἰ ei 'if', ὡς hōs 'since', ἀλλ᾽ all᾽ 'but', τοῦτ᾽ toût᾽ 'this', according to Herodian.

(f) Certain personal pronouns in oblique cases when non-emphatic:

- με me 'me', μου mou, μοι moi,
- σε se 'you (sg)', σου sou, σοι soi
- ἑ he 'him(self)', οὑ hou, οἱ hoi,
- νιν/μιν nin/min 'him' (poetic)
- σφας sphas 'them(selves)', σφων sphōn, σφισι sphisi

In classical writers, ἑ he 'him' and σφας sphas 'them' tend to be used in indirect speech referring to the speaker:

- ἐκέλευσε δραμόντα τὸν παῖδα περιμεῖναί ἑ κελεῦσαι ekéleuse dramónta tòn paîda perimeînaí he keleûsai
  'he ordered the slave-boy to run and ask the man to wait for him' (Plato)

Some of these pronouns also have non-enclitic forms which are accented. The non-enclitic form of με, μου, μοι me, mou, moi 'me', 'of me', 'to me' is ἐμέ, ἐμοῦ, ἐμοί emé, emoû, emoí. The accented forms are used at the beginning of a sentence and (usually) after prepositions:

- σὲ καλῶ sè kalô 'I'm calling you'
- ἐν σοί en soí 'in you'

==== Enclitic rules ====
When an enclitic follows a proparoxytone or a properispomenon word, the main word has two accents:

- Ἕλληνές τινες Héllēnés tines 'certain Greeks'
- δοῦλός ἐστι doûlós esti 'he's a slave'

When it follows an oxytone word or an accentless word, there is an acute on the final syllable:

- εἰπέ μοι eipé moi 'tell me'
- εἴ τις eí tis 'if anyone'

When it follows perispomenon or paroxytone word, there is no additional accent, and a monosyllabic enclitic remains accentless:

- ὁρῶ σε horô se 'I see you'
- λέγε μοι lége moi 'tell me'

A two-syllable enclitic has no accent after a perispomenon:

- ἀγαθοῦ τινος agathoû tinos 'of some good thing'
- τοξοτῶν τινων toxotôn tinōn 'of some archers'

But a two-syllabled enclitic has one after a paroxytone word (otherwise the accent would come more than three syllables from the end of the combined word). After a paroxytone τινῶν tinôn has a circumflex:

- ἄλλοι τινές álloi tinés 'certain others'
- ὅπλων τινῶν hóplōn tinôn 'of some weapons'

A word ending in ξ x or ψ ps behaves as if it was paroxytone and does not take an additional accent:

- κῆρυξ ἐστίν kêrux estín 'he is a herald'

A two-syllable enclitic is also accented after an elision:

- πολλοὶ δ' εἰσίν polloì d' eisín 'there are many'

When two or three enclitics come in a row, according to Apollonius and Herodian, each passes its accent to the preceding word (although some modern editors have queried this):

- ἤ νύ σέ που δέος ἴσχει ḗ nú sé pou déos ískhei 'or perhaps fear is holding you back'

It appears that with certain long-vowelled enclitics, such as που, πως, πῃ, πω pou, pōs, pēi, pō, Herodian recommended that they should be left unaccented when another enclitic followed. However, most modern editors ignore this second rule, and print εἴ πού τις eí poú tis 'if anyone anywhere' rather than εἴ που τις eí pou tis.

=== Verbs ===
In verbs, the accent is grammatical rather than lexical; that is to say, it distinguishes different parts of the verb rather than one verb from another. In the indicative mood it is usually recessive, but in other parts of the verb it is often non-recessive.

Except for the nominative singular of certain participles (e.g., masculine λαβών labṓn, neuter λαβόν labón 'after taking'), a few imperatives (such as εἰπέ eipé 'say'), and the irregular present tenses (φημί phēmí 'I say' and εἰμί eimí 'I am'), no parts of the verb are oxytone.

==== Indicative ====
In the indicative of most verbs, other than contracting verbs, the accent is recessive, meaning it moves as far back towards the beginning of the word as allowed by the length of the last vowel. Thus, verbs of three or more syllables often have an acute accent on the penult or antepenult, depending on whether the last vowel is long or short (with final -αι -ai counted as short):

- δίδωμι dídōmi 'I give'
- λαμβάνω lambánō 'I take'
- κελεύει keléuei 'he orders'
- ἐκέλευσε ekéleuse 'he ordered'
- βούλομαι boúlomai 'I want'

Monosyllabic verbs, such as βῆ bê 'he went' (poetic) and εἶ eî 'you are', because they are recessive, have a circumflex. An exception is φῄς phḗis or φής phḗs 'you say'.

A few 3rd person plurals have a contracted ending (the other persons are recessive):

- ἀφιᾶσι aphiâsi 'they send off'
- ἱστᾶσι histâsi 'they stand (transitive)'
- τεθνᾶσι tethnâsi 'they have died'
- ἑστᾶσι hestâsi 'they are standing (intransitive)'

When a verb is preceded by an augment, the accent goes no further back than the augment itself:

- ἐξῆν exên 'it was possible'
- εἰσῆλθον eisêlthon 'they entered'

==== Contracting verbs ====
Contracting verbs are underlyingly recessive, that is, the accent is in the same place it had been before the vowels contracted. When an acute and a non-accented vowel merge, the result is a circumflex. In practice therefore, several parts of contracting verbs are non-recessive:

- ποιῶ poiô 'I do' (earlier ποιέω)
- ἐποίουν epoíoun 'I was doing' (earlier ἐποίεον)
- ποιοῦσι poioûsi 'they do' (earlier ποιέουσι)

Contracting futures such as ἀγγελῶ angelô 'I will announce' and ἐρῶ erô 'I will say' are accented like ποιῶ poiô.

==== Imperative ====
The accent is recessive in the imperative of most verbs:

- λέγε lége 'say!'
- σταύρωσον staúrōson 'crucify!'
- μέμνησο mémnēso 'remember!'
- φάγε pháge 'eat!'
- δότε dóte 'give (pl.)!'
- ἄπιθι ápithi 'go away (sg.)!'
- διάβηθι diábēthi 'go across (sg.)!'
- φάθι pháthi 'say!'

In compounded monosyllabic verbs, however, the imperative is paroxytone:

- ἀπόδος apódos 'give back!'
- περίθες períthes 'place round!'

The strong aorist imperative active (2nd person singular only) of the following five verbs (provided they are not prefixed) is oxytone:

- εἰπέ eipé 'say', ἐλθέ elthé 'come', εὑρέ heuré 'find', ἰδέ idé 'see', λαβέ labé 'take!' (the last two in Attic only)

However, if plural or prefixed, these imperatives are recessive:

- εἴπετε eípete 'say (pl.)!', ἔλθετε élthete, etc.
- εἴσελθε eíselthe 'come in!'

The strong aorist imperative middle of all verbs (2nd person singular only) is perispomenon:

- ἑλοῦ heloû 'choose!'
- γενοῦ genoû 'become!'

But the following is usually printed with an acute:

- ἰδού idoú 'behold!'

As with the active imperative, the plurals always have a recessive accent:

- ἴδεσθε ídesthe 'see!'

==== Subjunctive ====
The subjunctive of regular thematic verbs in the present tense or the weak or strong aorist tense is recessive, except for the aorist passive:

- λέγῃ légēi 'he may say'
- λέγωσι légōsi 'they may say'
- λύσῃ lúsēi 'he may free'
- λάβῃ lábēi 'he may take'

It is also recessive in the verb εἶμι eîmi 'I go' and verbs ending in -υμι -umi:

- ἀπίῃ apíēi 'he may go away'
- ἀποδεικνύῃ apodeiknúēi 'he may point out'

But in the aorist passive, in the compounded aorist active of βαίνω baínō 'I go', and in all tenses of other athematic verbs, it is non-recessive:

- λυθῶ luthô 'I may be freed'
- φανῶ phanô 'I may appear'
- διαβῇ diabêi 'he may go across'
- διδῶσι didôsi 'they may give',
- ἑστῶ hestô 'I may stand'
- παραδῶ paradô 'I may hand over'
- ἐξῇ exêi 'it may be possible'

==== Optative ====
The optative similarly is recessive in regular verbs in the same tenses. The optative endings -οι -oi and -αι -ai count as long vowels for the purpose of accentuation:

- λύσαι lúsai 'he might free'
- λάβοι láboi 'he might take'

But in the aorist passive, in the compounded aorist active of βαίνω baínō 'I go', and in all tenses of athematic verbs (other than εἶμι eîmi 'I go' and verbs ending in -υμι -umi), it is non-recessive:

- λυθεῖεν lutheîen 'they might be freed'
- φανεῖεν phaneîen 'they might appear'
- διαβαῖεν diabaîen 'they might go across'
- διδοῖεν didoîen 'they might give'
- ἑσταῖεν hestaîen 'they might stand'
- παραδοῖεν paradoîen 'they might hand over'

But ἀπίοι apíoi 'he might go away' is accented recessively like a regular verb.

==== Infinitive ====
The present and future infinitive of regular thematic verbs is recessive:

- λέγειν légein 'to say'
- λύσειν lúsein 'to be going to free'
- βούλεσθαι boúlesthai 'to want'
- ἔσεσθαι ésesthai 'to be going to be'

But all other infinitives are non-recessive, for example the weak aorist active:

- κωλῦσαι kōlûsai 'to prevent'
- κολάσαι kolásai 'to punish'

Strong aorist active and middle:

- λαβεῖν labeîn 'to take'
- γενέσθαι genésthai 'to become'
- ἀφικέσθαι aphikésthai 'to arrive'

Weak and strong aorist passive:

- λυθῆναι luthênai 'to be freed'
- φανῆναι phanênai 'to appear'

The aorist active of βαίνω baínō 'I go' when compounded:

- διαβῆναι diabênai 'to go across'

The present and aorist infinitives of all athematic verbs:

- διδόναι didónai 'to give'
- ἰέναι iénai 'to go'
- ἐξεῖναι exeînai 'to be possible'
- προδοῦναι prodoûnai 'to betray'

But the Homeric ἔμμεναι émmenai 'to be' and δόμεναι dómenai 'to give' are recessive.

The perfect active, middle, and passive:

- λελυκέναι lelukénai 'to have freed'
- λελύσθαι lelústhai 'to have been freed'

==== Participles ====
The present, future and weak aorist participles of regular thematic verbs are recessive:

- λέγων légōn 'saying'
- βουλόμενος boulómenos 'wanting'
- λύσων lúsōn 'going to free'
- ἀκούσας akoúsas 'having heard'

But all other participles are non-recessive. These include the strong aorist active:

- λαβών labṓn, masc. pl. λαβόντες labóntes, fem. sg. λαβοῦσα laboûsa 'after taking'

The weak and strong aorist passive:

- λυθείς lutheís, masc. pl. λυθέντες luthéntes, fem.sg. λυθεῖσα lutheîsa 'after being freed'
- φανείς phaneís, masc. pl. φανέντες phanéntes, fem.sg. φανεῖσα phaneîsa 'after appearing'

The compounded aorist active of βαίνω baínō 'I go':

- διαβάς diabás, διαβάντες diabántes, fem.sg. διαβᾶσα diabâsa 'after going across'

The present and aorist participles of athematic verbs:

- διδούς didoús 'giving', masc.pl. διδόντες didóntes, fem.sg. διδοῦσα didoûsa
- ἰών iṓn, masc.pl. ἰόντες ióntes, fem.sg. ἰοῦσα ioûsa 'going'
- παραδούς paradoús, masc.pl. παραδόντες paradóntes, fem.sg. παραδοῦσα paradoûsa 'after handing over'
- ἐξόν exón (neuter) 'it being possible'

The perfect active, middle, and passive:

- λελυκώς lelukṓs, masc. pl. λελυκότες lelukótes, fem.sg. λελυκυῖα lelukuîa 'having freed'
- λελυμένος leluménos 'having been freed'

==== 'I am' and 'I say' ====
Two athematic verbs, εἰμί eimí 'I am' and φημί phēmí 'I say', are exceptional in that in the present indicative they are usually enclitic. When this happens they put an accent on the word before them and lose their own accent:

- αἴτιός εἰμι aítiós eimi 'I am responsible'
- οὔ φησι oú phēsi 'he says ... not'

But both verbs can also begin a sentence, or follow a comma, or an elision, in which case they are not enclitic. In this case the accent is usually on the final syllable (e.g. εἰμί eimí, φημί phēmí). When it follows an elision, ἐστίν estín is also accented on the final:

- τί ποτ' ἐστίν; tí pot' estín? 'what (ever) is it?'

However, the 3rd person singular ἐστί estí also has a strong form, ἔστι ésti, which is used 'when the word expresses existence or possibility (i.e. when it is translatable with expressions such as 'exists', 'there is', or 'it is possible').' This form is used among other places in the phrase οὐκ ἔστι ouk ésti 'it is not' and at the beginning of sentences, such as:

- ἔστιν θάλασσα· τίς δέ νιν κατασβέσει; éstin thálassa; tís dé nin katasbései? 'The sea exists; and who shall quench it?'

The 2nd person singular εἶ eî 'you are' and φῄς phḗis 'you say' are not enclitic.

The future of the verb 'to be' has its accent on the verb itself even when prefixed:

- ἀπέσται apéstai 'he will be away'

==== Verbal adjectives ====
The verbal adjectives ending in -τέος -téos and -τέον -téon are always paroxytone:

- κολαστέος ἐστί kolastéos estí 'he needs to be punished'
- κολαστέον τοὺς ἀδίκους kolastéon toùs adíkous 'it is necessary to punish wrong-doers'

The adjective ending in -τος -tos is usually oxytone, especially when it refers to something which is capable of happening:

- κλυτός klutós 'famous (able to be heard about)'
- διαλυτός dialutós 'capable of being taken apart'
- ποιητός poiētós 'made, adopted'

== Accent shift laws ==
Comparison with Sanskrit as well as the statements of grammarians shows that the accent in some Greek words has shifted from its position in Proto-Indo-European.

=== Wheeler's law ===
Wheeler's law, suggested in 1885 by Benjamin Ide Wheeler, refers to a process whereby words with a dactylic ending –◡◡ (counting endings such as -on, -os, -oi as short), if they were oxytone in Proto-Indo-European, became paroxytone in Greek. It is also known as the "law of dactylic retraction".

This law is used to explain the paroxytone accent in words such as the following:

- Adjectives such as ποικίλος poikílos 'multicoloured', ἐναντίος enantíos 'opposite', πλησίος plēsíos 'near'
- Names such as Αἰσχύλος Aiskhúlos 'Aeschylus'
- Perfect passive and middle participles such as δεδεγμένος dedegménos 'having received'
- Paroxytone compound words with active meaning such as ἀνδροκτόνος androktónos 'man-slaying', βουκόλος boukólos 'cowherd'
- Dative plurals such as πατράσι patrási 'fathers', ἀνδράσι andrási 'men'

Similar words and endings in Sanskrit are regularly accented on the final syllable, and active compounds which do not have a dactylic rhythm often have final accent, e.g. ψυχοπομπός psukhopompós 'soul-escorting'.

There are numerous exceptions to Wheeler's law, especially words ending in -ικός -ikós or -ικόν -ikón (for example, ναυτικόν nautikón 'fleet'), which are always oxytone. There are also participles such as δεδομένος dedoménos or feminine δεδομένη dedoménē 'given', which have penultimate accent despite not being dactylic. These exceptions are usually explained as being due to analogical processes.

=== Bartoli's law ===
Bartoli's law (pronunciation /'bartoli/), proposed in 1930 by Matteo Bartoli, aims to explain how some oxytone words ending in the rhythm ◡– (short–long) have become paroxytone. Another name is the "law of iambic retraction". Examples are:

- θυγάτηρ thugátēr 'daughter', presumed to have come from an earlier *θυγατήρ *thugatḗr (compare Vedic duhitá:)
- δεσπότης despótēs 'master', presumed to have come from an earlier *δεσποτής *despotḗs

The existence of such a law has been called into question, however, and it is argued that most or all of the words proposed as examples have other explanations.

=== Vendryes's law ===
Vendryes's law (pronunciation /vɑ̃dʁi'jɛs/), proposed in 1945 by Joseph Vendryes, describes how words of the rhythm ◡–◡, which had penultimate accent in other dialects, came to be pronounced proparoxytone in Attic (that is, the dialect of Athens). This change appears to have taken place about 400 BC, and was known to the Greek grammarians who wrote on accentuation. One ancient commentator on Aristophanes wrote: τροπαῖον tropaîon ('trophy') should be read as properispomenon in Aristophanes and Thucydides, but as proparoxytone τρόπαιον trópaion in later poets.

The law affected words like the following:

- τρόπαιον trópaion, ἕταιρος hétairos 'companion', ἕτοιμος hétoimos 'ready', ὅμοιος hómoios 'like', ἔρημος érēmos 'deserted', βέβαιος bébaios 'firm', which came from an earlier τροπαῖον, ἑταῖρος, ἑτοῖμος, ὁμοῖος, ἐρῆμος, βεβαῖος
- ἔγωγε égōge 'I at any rate', ἔμοιγε émoige 'to me at any rate', which came from an earlier ἐγώ γε, ἐμοί γε

The accent shift described by Vendryes's law seems to have affected mainly adjectives. Verbs such as ἀπῆλθον apêlthon 'I went away' and participles such as λαβοῦσα laboûsa 'having taken' were unaffected.

== Dialect variations ==
The ancient grammarians were aware that there were sometimes differences between their own accentuation and that of other dialects, for example that of the Homeric poems, which they could presumably learn from the traditional sung recitation.

=== Attic ===
Some peculiarities of Attic, the dialect of Athens, have been noted above under Vendryes's Law.

=== Aeolic ===
The Aeolic pronunciation, exemplified in the dialect of the 7th-century BC poets Sappho and Alcaeus from the island of Lesbos, differed in that every major word (but not prepositions or conjunctions) was pronounced recessively, thus:

- Ζεῦς Zeûs, σόφος sóphos, κάλος kálos, ἔμοι émoi, ὄρανος óranos, Ἄτρευς Átreus, Ἀχίλλευς Akhílleus, Σάπφω Sápphō for Ζεύς, σοφός, καλός, ἐμοί, οὐρανός, Ἀτρεύς, Ἀχιλλεύς, Σαπφώ

But Ἀλκαῖος Alkaîos 'Alcaeus' was apparently pronounced Ἀλκάος Alkáos in Lesbian.

The Boeotian dialect, although from the same dialect group as Lesbian, did not have this recessive accentuation, and appears not to have differed accentually from common (koine) Greek.

The grammarians give no details of the Thessalian dialect (another variety of Aeolic) but it has been suggested that the dropping of certain vowels in words on inscriptions indicates that it had a stress accent at the beginning of each word.

=== Doric ===
The Doric dialect also had certain peculiarities. One was that (some) properispomenon words were pronounced paroxytone. The examples given are 3rd declension nominative plural:

- παίδες paídes 'boys', γυναίκες gunaíkes, αἴγες aíges 'goats' (for παῖδες paîdes, γυναῖκες gunaîkes, αἶγες aîges)

On the other hand, it is reported that the 1st and 2nd declension accusative plural in Doric had a short vowel (-ăs, -ŏs), leading to accentuations such as:

- τῖμας tîmas 'honours', πᾶσας pâsas 'all' (for τίμας tímas, πάσας pásas)

Another characteristic of Doric was that the endings -οι -oi and perhaps -αι -ai, and in verbs 3rd pl. -ον -on and -αν -an (derived from an earlier *-ont and *-ant) counted as long, leading to a paroxytone accent in:

- φιλοσόφοι philosóphoi 'philosophers', καλουμένοι kalouménoi 'called', ἐδώκαν edṓkan 'they gave', ἐλέγον elégon 'they said'

Doric speakers also apparently pronounced a circumflex on certain genitive plurals, which were paroxytone in other dialects:

- παιδῶν paidôn 'of boys', Τρωῶν Trōôn 'of Trojans', παντῶν pantôn 'of all', ἀλλῶν allôn 'of others'

In Doric the future was also accented non-recessively in all verbs:

- λεξῶ lexô 'I will say', ποιησῶ poiēsô 'I will do'

== See also ==
- Pitch-accent language
- Syllable
- Delphic Hymns
- Mesomedes
- Glossary of sound laws in the Indo-European languages
