= Subjunctive (Ancient Greek) =

Grammatical mood in Ancient Greek

The subjunctive mood (Greek ὑποτακτική (hupotaktikḗ) "for arranging underneath", from ὑποτάσσω (hupotássō) "I arrange beneath") along with the indicative, optative, and imperative, is one of the four moods of the Ancient Greek verb. It can be used both in the meaning "should" (the jussive subjunctive) and in the meaning "may" (the potential subjunctive).

When used in its jussive sense ("should"), the subjunctive can be used in sentences such as the following:

- 1st person suggestions ("let me say", "let's go")
- Deliberative questions ("what should I do?")
- Negative commands ("don't be surprised!")

In its potential sense ("may"), the subjunctive is often used in indefinite conditional or similar clauses referring to the future or indefinite present time. These can be:

- Clauses referring to a single event at an indefinite future time ("if by chance...", "until such time as..." or "before such time as...")
- Clauses referring to repeated events in an indefinite present time ("whenever...", "whoever...", "if ever..." etc.)

Such subordinate clauses are introduced by a conjunction or relative pronoun combined with the particle ἄν (án), e.g. ἐάν (eán) 'if', ὅταν (hótan) 'whenever', ὅσαν (hósan) 'whoever' etc. When the context is past, the optative is used in such clauses, without the particle ἄν (án).

The potential subjunctive, usually without ἄν (án), is also used in subordinate clauses such as the following:

- Purpose clauses ("so that it can happen")
- After verbs of fearing or doubt ("I fear it may happen", "I doubt if it can happen")

In a past time context a writer has a choice to use either the subjunctive or the optative mood in such sentences.

Without an introductory verb, but preceded by μή (mḗ) "not", the potential subjunctive can also be used for:

- Doubtful or emphatic assertions about the future ("it may be that.." or "it is certain that...")

The two moods subjunctive and optative together cover most of the areas covered by the Latin subjunctive. However, one area for which the subjunctive is used in Latin but not in Greek is for counterfactual situations in the present or past (e.g. "it would be happening", "it would have happened"). For this area of meaning the imperfect and aorist indicative tenses are used in Ancient Greek.

The subjunctive is still used today in Modern Greek, whereas the optative has died out.

The subjunctive can usually be recognised easily from the fact that it almost always has the letters ω (ō) or η (ē) in the ending, for example εἴπωμεν (eípōmen), γένηται (génētai). It exists in three tenses only: the present, the aorist, and the perfect. The perfect is, however, rarely used.

The difference between the present and aorist subjunctive is one of aspect rather than of time. In sentences looking forward to the future such as "I am afraid it may happen", the aorist describes single events, whereas the present subjunctive primarily refers to on-going situations or habitually repeated events. In sentences describing repeated events at an indefinite time such as "whenever he has finished, he sits down", the aorist refers to events which, though repeated, precede the time of the main verb.

Except sometimes in Homer, the negative used with the subjunctive is always μή (mḗ).

== Uses ==
=== Jussive subjunctive ===
Just as in Latin, the Greek subjunctive can sometimes be used for giving suggestions or commands. This use is known as the "jussive" subjunctive.

==== 1st person suggestions ====
The jussive subjunctive has several uses. One use is in 1st person plural exhortations (the "hortatory" subjunctive):

ἄγε νῡν, ἴωμεν.
áge nūn, íōmen.
Come now, let's go.

More rarely, generally preceded by φέρε δή (phére dḗ), it can be used in the 1st person singular:

φέρε δὴ δείξω ὑμῖν.
phére dḕ deíxō humîn.
Come now, let me show you.

Since Ancient Greek has a 3rd person imperative, the imperative rather than the subjunctive is usually used for 3rd person commands or suggestions where Latin would use a 3rd person subjunctive (e.g. veniat "let him come").

==== Deliberative questions ====
Similarly the subjunctive is used in deliberative questions, usually in the 1st person:

εἴπωμεν ἢ σῑγῶμεν;
eípōmen ḕ sīgômen?
Should we speak (aorist) or should we remain silent (present)?

==== Negative commands ====
The subjunctive mood can also be used for 2nd person negative commands, but only with the aorist tense. The negative, as with almost all uses of the subjunctive, is μή (mḗ):

μὴ θαυμάσῃς.
mḕ thaumásēis. (aorist subjunctive)
Don't be surprised.

However, when the meaning of the negative command is "don't continue to do something", μή (mḗ) is used not with the subjunctive but with the present imperative:

μὴ κλαίετε.
mḕ klaíete. (present imperative)
Don't weep (= don't continue to weep).

=== Subjunctive in indefinite clauses ===
The subjunctive mood is often used in indefinite subordinate clauses referring to an unknown time in the future (e.g. "if this should happen") or to an unspecified time in the present (e.g. "whenever this happens"). Such clauses are always introduced by a conjunction or relative pronoun combined with the particle ἄν (án), such as ἐάν (eán) "if by chance", ὅταν (hótan) "whenever", or ὃς ἄν (hòs án) "whoever".

Clauses of this type can only refer to an indefinite present or future time, never to the past, for which the optative is used, without ἄν (án) (see Optative (Ancient Greek)).

==== If (in future) ====
The subjunctive is often used in the protasis (i.e. the "if" clause) of conditional sentences after the conjunction ἐάν (eán), which can be shortened to ἤν or ἄν (eā́n, ḗn, ā́n) "if (by chance)" or "if (in future)", referring to a future situation that is quite likely to happen. Conditional sentences of this kind are referred to by Smyth as the "more vivid" future conditions:

ἢν μὲν ἀνάγκη ᾖ, πολεμήσομεν.
ḕn mèn anánkē êi, polemḗsomen.
If it's necessary, we shall make war.

The negative used with the potential subjunctive, as with the jussive subjunctive, is μή (mḗ):

ἢν μὴ ’θέλωσι, ἀναγκάσουσιν.
ḕn mḕ ’thélōsi, anankásousin.
If they are not willing, they will force them.

==== Before, until ====
The same construction is used with πρὶν ἄν (prìn án) "before" and ἕως ἄν (héōs án) "until such time as" referring to an event or situation which it is expected will occur at an indefinite future time:

οὐ παύσομαι πρὶν ἂν φράσῃς μοι.
ou paúsomai prìn àn phrásēis moi.
I shan't stop until you tell me (whenever that is).

λέγε, ἕως ἂν οἴκαδε ὥρᾱ ᾖ ἀπιέναι.
lége, héōs àn oíkade hṓrā êi apiénai.
Carry on speaking, until it is time to go home (whenever that is).

==== Whenever, whoever, etc. ====
Another very similar use of the subjunctive is in indefinite subordinate clauses following a conjunction such as ἐᾱ́ν (eā́n) "if ever", ὅταν (hótan) "whenever", ὃς ἄν (hòs án) "whoever", etc., referring to repeated actions in indefinite present time.

δυνατὸς δέ γ’ ἐστὶν ἕκαστος ἄρα, ὃς ἂν ποιῇ ὃ ἂν βούληται, ὅταν βούληται.
dunatòs dé g’ estìn hékastos ára, hòs àn poiêi hò àn boúlētai, hótan boúlētai.
So everyone is powerful who does whatever he wants whenever he wants.

ὅταν δέ τις πειρᾶται παριέναι, κυλίνδουσι λίθους.
hótan dé tis peirâtai pariénai, kulíndousi líthous.
Whenever anyone tries to pass, they roll stones.

τοῖς φυγάσιν ἔξεστιν οἰκεῖν ὅπου ἂν θέλωσιν.
toîs phugásin éxestin oikeîn hópou àn thélōsin.
It's possible for exiles to live wherever they wish.

ὅπου ἂν στρατοπεδεύωνται, τάφρον περιβάλλονται.
hópou àn stratopedeúōntai, táphron peribállontai.
Wherever they make a camp, they throw a ditch around it.

ὅπως ἄν (hópōs án) means "in whatever way". But it can also mean "so that" and be used in purpose clauses (see below).

οὕτω γὰρ ποιήσω ὅπως ἂν σὺ κελεύῃς.
hoútō gàr poiḗsō hópōs àn sù keleúēis.
I shall do as (= in whatever way) you order.

The equivalent of this construction in past time uses the optative mood without ἄν (án) (see Optative (Ancient Greek)). Unlike with purpose clauses and after verbs of fearing, the subjunctive is not used in a past-time context in such clauses.

=== Other uses of the subjunctive ===
==== Purpose clauses ====
The subjunctive is also used in purpose clauses with ἵνα (hína), especially those referring to present or future time:

δίδαξον καὶ ἐμέ, ἵνα σοφώτερος γένωμαι.
dídaxon kaì emé, hína sophṓteros génōmai.
Teach me too, so that I can become wiser.

ἵνα (hína) "so that" is never used with ἄν (án). On the other hand, when ὅπως (hópōs) is used, ἄν (án) is usually added, although ὅπως (hópōs) can also be used alone:

ἀλλὰ πῦρ τις ἐξενεγκάτω ... ὅπως ἂν εὐξώμεσθα τοῖς θεοῖς.
allà pûr tis exenenkátō ... hópōs àn euxṓmestha toîs theoîs.
But let someone bring out some fire, so that we can pray to the gods.

ὅπως δὲ γνωσθῇ ὅτι ἀληθὲς τοῦτο λέγω, πρῶτον διηγήσομαι τὴν φύσιν τῆς Ἀττικῆς.
hópōs dè gnōsthêi hóti alēthès toûto légō, prôton diēgḗsomai tḕn phúsin tês Attikês.
But so that it may be known that what I'm saying is true, first I shall describe the nature of Attica.

In a past context purpose clause, the optative mood without ἄν (án) is often used (see Optative (Ancient Greek)), but it is also possible to use the subjunctive even in a past context:

Ἀβροκόμᾱς κατέκαυσεν [τὰ πλοῖα], ἵνα μὴ Κῦρος διαβῇ.
Abrokómās katékausen [tà ploîa], hína mḕ Kûros diabêi. (aorist subjunctive)
Abrocomas had burnt the boats, so that Cyrus couldn't cross.

Purpose clauses can also be made with ὅπως (hópōs) and the imperfect, aorist, or future indicative.

==== After verbs of fearing ====
The subjunctive is used after verbs of fearing to express fears for the future, after a verb of fearing in the present tense. In this case the word μή (mḗ) "lest" is always added after the verb of fearing:

φοβεῖται μὴ πολιορκώμεθα.
phobeîtai mḕ poliorkṓmetha.
He is afraid that we may be besieged.

In a past context the optative mood is generally used instead of the subjunctive (see Optative (Ancient Greek). However, as with purpose clauses, the subjunctive may optionally be used even when the context is past:

ἐφοβήθησαν μὴ πολέμιαι ὦσιν.
ephobḗthēsan mḕ polémiai ôsin.
They were afraid at first that (the ships) might be (lit. may be) hostile.

Doubts can be expressed in Ancient Greek by using εἰ (ei) "if" or an indirect question and the subjunctive after a verb of fearing:

φόβος εἰ πείσω δέσποιναν ἐμήν.
phóbos ei peísō déspoinan emḗn.
I doubt if I can persuade my mistress.

When the sentence has the form "I fear that something is the case or was the case", referring to the present or past, the indicative, not the subjunctive, is used.

==== Doubtful and emphatic assertions ====
Similar to its use with verbs of fearing, the subjunctive with μή (mḗ) is sometimes used in doubtful assertions, meaning "it may be the case that" or (with μὴ οὐ(κ) (mḕ ou(k))) "it may not be the case that", especially in Plato:

μὴ οὐχ οὕτως ἔχῃ.
mḕ oukh hoútōs ékhēi.
Possibly it may not be so.

A similar construction, but with οὐ μή (ou mḗ) rather than μὴ οὐ (mḕ ou), can also be used for an emphatic assertion, as in this sentence from the New Testament, always negative and usually with the aorist subjunctive:

μήποτε οὐ μὴ ἀρκέσῃ ἡμῖν καὶ ὑμῖν.
mḗpote ou mḕ arkésēi hēmîn kaì humîn.
Certainly there won't be enough (oil) both for us and for you!

== Tense and the subjunctive ==
The subjunctive, like the imperative, is found in only three tenses: the present, aorist, and perfect. The difference between these tenses is generally not one of time, but of aspect. Thus when a subjunctive verb is used prospectively to refer to a future event or situation (e.g. "I am afraid it may happen"), the aorist is used to refer to an event, the present to a situation (or habitual series of events):

εἴπωμεν ἢ σῑγῶμεν;
eípōmen ḕ sīgômen?
Should we speak (event – aorist subjunctive) or should we remain silent (situation – present subjunctive)?

When the subjunctive is used with ἄν (án) in indefinite clauses (e.g. "whenever he has spoken, he sits down"), the aorist refers to an event which takes place earlier than the main verb:

ἐπειδὰν δὲ οὗτοι πάντες εἴπωσι, τότ’ ἤδη κελεύει λέγειν τῶν ἄλλων Ἀθηναίων τὸν βουλόμενον, οἷς ἔξεστιν.
epeidā̀n dè hoûtoi pántes eípōsi, tót’ ḗdē keleúei légein tôn állōn Athēnaíōn tòn boulómenon.
And when all of these men have spoken, then (the herald) orders any of the other Athenians who wishes to speak, to say his piece.

But when the subjunctive verb in an indefinite clause refers to a situation which is simultaneous with the time of the main verb, the present subjunctive is used:

ἐπειδὰν ἡγῆται βασιλεύς, οὐδεὶς αὐτοῦ πρόσθεν πορεύεται.
epeidā̀n hēgêtai basileús, oudeìs autoû prósthen poreúetai.
Whenever a king is leading, no one walks in front of him.

μαινόμεθα πάντες ὁπόταν ὀργιζώμεθα.
mainómetha pántes hopótan orgizṓmetha.
We are all mad whenever we are angry.

The perfect subjunctive also refers to a situation existing at the time of the main verb, but as a result of something which happened earlier, as in the example below:

ἐάν τε ἑαλωκὼς ᾖ ἐάν τε μή, δηλούτω.
eā́n te healōkṑs êi eā́n te mḗ, dēloútō.
Whether (the hare) has been caught or not, (the huntsman) should make it clear (to his colleagues).

== Morphology ==
Subjunctive endings almost always contain the letters η or ω, except in the 2nd and 3rd person singular of -όω verbs, which have -οῖς, -οῖ, and in the 2nd and 3rd singular and 2nd plural of -άω verbs, which have -ᾷς, -ᾷ, -ᾶτε like the indicative.

The order of the endings in the tables below is: "I", "you sg.", "he/she/it", "we", "you pl.", "they".

A 2nd and 3rd person dual number (e.g. ἦτον "you both may be", ἦτον "they both may be") also exists but in most verbs it is rare. It is omitted from these tables.

subjunctive	present								
subjunctive	λῡ́ω	ποιέω	τῑμάω	δηλόω	εἰμί	εἶμι	φημί	δίδωμι	οἶδα
active	λῡ́ω λῡ́ῃς λῡ́ῃ λῡ́ωμεν λῡ́ητε λῡ́ωσι(ν)	ποιῶ ποιῇς ποιῇ ποιῶμεν ποιῆτε ποιῶσι(ν)	τῑμῶ τῑμᾷς τῑμᾷ τῑμῶμεν τῑμᾶτε τῑμῶσι(ν)	δηλῶ δηλοῖς δηλοῖ δηλῶμεν δηλῶτε δηλῶσι(ν)	ὦ ᾖς ᾖ ὦμεν ἦτε ὦσι(ν)	ἴω ἴῃς ἴῃ ἴωμεν ἴητε ἴωσι(ν)	φῶ φῇς φῇ φῶμεν φῆτε φῶσι(ν)	διδῶ διδῷς διδῷ διδῶμεν διδῶτε διδῶσι(ν)	εἰδῶ εἰδῷς εἰδῷ εἰδῶμεν εἰδῶτε εἰδῶσι(ν)

subjunctive	aorist					perfect
subjunctive	ἔλῡσα	ἔλαβον	-έβην	ἔδωκα	ἔγνων	λέλῠκα
active (cont.)	λῡ́σω λῡ́σῃς λῡ́σῃ λῡ́σωμεν λῡ́σητε λῡ́σωσι(ν)	λάβω λάβῃς λάβῃ λάβωμεν λάβητε λάβωσι(ν)	-βῶ -βῇς -βῇ -βῶμεν -βῆτε -βῶσι(ν)	δῶ δῷς δῷ δῶμεν δῶτε δῶσι(ν)	γνῶ γνῷς γνῷ γνῶμεν γνῶτε γνῶσι(ν)	λελυκὼς ὦ λελυκὼς ᾖς λελυκὼς ᾖ λελυκότες ὦμεν λελυκότες ἦτε λελυκότες ὦσι(ν)

- βαίνω "I go" is almost always used with a prefix (e.g. δια-, κατα-, συμ- etc.) except in poetry.
- The perfect subjunctive is very rare. It is usually made from the perfect participle plus the subjunctive of εἰμί, although occasionally the endings are added directly to the stem.
- Instead of δῷ and γνῷ Homer has δώῃ and γνώῃ. The New Testament has contracted forms δοῖ and γνοῖ, which despite having the appearance of optatives are generally analysed as aorist subjunctive.

subjunctive	present		aorist		perfect
subjunctive	λῡ́ομαι	ποιοῦμαι	ἐλῡσάμην	ἐγενόμην	λέλῠμαι
middle	λῡ́ωμαι λῡ́ῃ λῡ́ηται λῡώμεθα λῡ́ησθε λῡ́ωνται	ποιῶμαι ποιῇ ποιῆται ποιώμεθα ποιῆσθε ποιῶνται	λῡ́σωμαι λῡ́σῃ λῡ́σηται λῡσώμεθα λῡ́σησθε λῡ́σωνται	γένωμαι γένῃ γένηται γενώμεθα γένησθε γένωνται	λελυμένος ὦ λελυμένος ᾖς λελυμένος ᾖ λελυμένοι ὦμεν λελυμένοι ἦτε λελυμένοι ὦσι(ν)

subjunctive	present		aorist	perfect
subjunctive	λῡ́ομαι	ποιοῦμαι	ἐλύθην	λέλῠμαι
passive	λῡ́ωμαι λῡ́ῃ λῡ́ηται λῡώμεθα λῡ́ησθε λῡ́ωνται	ποιῶμαι ποιῇ ποιῆται ποιώμεθα ποιῆσθε ποιῶνται	λῠθῶ λυθῇς λυθῇ λυθῶμεν λυθῆτε λυθῶσι(ν)	λελυμένος ὦ λελυμένος ᾖς λελυμένος ᾖ λελυμένοι ὦμεν λελυμένοι ἦτε λελυμένοι ὦσι(ν)

- βλαβῶ "I may be harmed" and φανῶ "I may appear" have endings similar to λυθῶ.
- The aorist endings -θῶ, -θῇς etc. are sometimes middle in meaning.
