= Optative (Ancient Greek) =

Grammatical mood of Ancient Greek verbs

The optative mood (/ˈɒptətɪv/ or /ɒpˈteɪtɪv/; Ancient Greek [ἔγκλισις] εὐκτική, [énklisis] euktikḗ, "[inflection] for wishing", Latin optātīvus [modus] "[mode] for wishing") is a grammatical mood of the Ancient Greek verb, named for its use as a way to express wishes.

The optative mood in Greek is found in four different tenses (present, aorist, perfect, and future) and in all three voices (active, middle, and passive). It has multiple uses:

- To express wishes for the future ("may it happen!")
- To talk about a hypothetical future situation ("what would happen if I did this?")
- In purpose clauses ("so that it could happen") or clauses expressing fears ("for fear that it might happen") in a past context. (The subjunctive mood can also be used in this type of clause in a past context.)
- In subordinate clauses referring to repeated events in a past context ("whenever it happened,", "whoever did this," etc.)
- To indicate reported speech in a past context ("he said that it had happened," "he asked who they were")
- In epic dialects, contrary-to-fact clauses in the present

Post-Homeric Greek is similar to many languages in its use of a "fake past" for contrary-to-fact clauses, e.g., "if dogs had hands." However, Homer uses the present optative for such statements when they are imagined to be at the present time. Together, the optative and the subjunctive cover most of the areas for which the Latin subjunctive is used, but Greek is unlike Latin in not using the subjunctive for contrary-to-fact suppositions.

Over the centuries, the optative mood became more and more rarely used, and it has disappeared in Modern Greek.

== Uses ==
=== Wishes ===
The optative of wish or volitive optative expresses wishes for the future: "may it happen!" It is sometimes preceded by εἴθε (eíthe) or εἰ γάρ (ei gár) "if only":

γένοιο πατρὸς εὐτυχέστερος. (Sophocles)
génoio patròs eutukhésteros. (aorist optative).
May you be more fortunate than your father!

A wish is not always expressed in Ancient Greek by an optative mood. If the wish is for the present or past, the imperfect indicative or aorist indicative is used:

εἴθε σοι, ὦ Περίκλεις, τότε συνεγενόμην. (Xenophon)
eíthe soi, ô Períkleis, tóte sunegenómēn. (aorist indicative).
If only, Pericles, I had been with you then!

In the New Testament, the volitive optative is often used in formal benedictions and prayers, for example:

δῴη ἔλεος ὁ κύριος. (2 Timothy)
dṓiē éleos ho kúrios. (aorist optative).
May the Lord grant mercy.

It can also be used for wishes, as in this example from Luke's Gospel:

γένοιτό μοι κατὰ τὸ ῥῆμά σου. (Luke)
génoitó moi katà tò rhêmá sou. (aorist optative).
May it happen to me according to your word.

=== Potential ===
The potential optative expresses something that would happen in a hypothetical situation in the future. In the main clause of conditional sentences it is always accompanied by the modal particle ἄν (án), Homeric κέ(ν) (ké(n)):

οὐκ ἂν θαυμάζοιμι. (Plato)
ouk àn thaumázoimi. (present optative).
I wouldn't be surprised (if that were so).

After εἰ (ei) "if" the optative without ἄν (án) is similarly used to refer to a hypothetical future situation:

οὐδέν γε ἄτοπον εἰ ἀποθάνοιμι. (Plato)
oudén ge átopon ei apothánoimi. (aorist optative).
There would be nothing strange about it if I were to die (if such a situation occurred).

In the New Testament, the potential optative with ἄν (án) occurs, but rarely (e.g. Acts 8:31); εἰ (ei) with the optative also sometimes occurs (e.g. 1 Peter 3:14).

=== Potential in the past ===
The optative is used by some authors in dependent clauses in past time of the type "so that it might", "for fear that it might", "(they begged) that it might", "in case it might be possible" and so on to express what it was planned, feared, requested or hoped might happen at a later time than the main verb.

==== Purpose clauses ====
For purpose clauses in past time, the optative can follow a conjunction such as ὅπως (hópōs), ὡς (hōs) or ἵνα (hína) "so that":

συνέλεξα ὑμᾶς, ὅπως βουλευσαίμεθα ὅ τι χρὴ ποιεῖν. (Xenophon)
sunélexa humâs, hópōs bouleusaímetha hó ti khrḕ poieîn. (aorist optative).
I (have) gathered you together so that we could discuss what we ought to do.

Some authors, however, such as Herodotus and Thucydides, sometimes use the subjunctive mood in such sentences, even in a past context, for example:

ξυνεβούλευε τοῖς ἄλλοις ἐκπλεῦσαι, ὅπως ἐπὶ πλέον ὁ σῖτος ἀντίσχῃ. (Thucydides)
xuneboúleue toîs állois ekpleûsai, hópōs epì pléon ho sîtos antískhēi. (aorist subjunctive).
He advised the others to sail away, so that the corn would hold out longer.

In the New Testament, this use of the subjunctive for purpose clauses in past time became the usual one.

==== After verbs of fearing ====
When the optative is used after a verb of fearing or caution, the negative particle μή (mḗ) "in case" or "lest" is added after the verb of fearing:

ἔδεισα μὴ πάθοιτέ τι. (Xenophon)
édeisa mḕ páthoité ti. (aorist optative).
I was afraid in case you might suffer some (harm).

Again, the subjunctive mood can be used instead of the optative even after a past tense verb (see Subjunctive (Ancient Greek)). The subjunctive is also used in New Testament Greek, replacing the optative in such sentences:

ἐφοβοῦντο γὰρ τὸν λαόν, μὴ λιθασθῶσιν. (Acts)
ephoboûnto gàr tòn laón, mḕ lithasthôsin. (aorist subjunctive).
For they feared the people, in case they might (lit. may) be stoned.

Although the optative after a verb of fearing usually refers to an event that might happen later than the main verb, sometimes it appears to refer to something that may have already happened:

ἔδεισα μὴ μαίνοιο. (Xenophon)
édeisa mḕ maínoio. (aorist optative).
I was afraid that you had gone mad.

Smyth explains examples of this type as meaning "I was afraid that it might turn out that you had gone mad", referring to what might prove to be the case later than the time of the main verb. The following example, which uses the perfect optative, is similar:

ἐδεδοίκειν μὴ ἐν τῷ κρατῆρι φάρμακα μεμιγμένα εἴη. (Xenophon)
ededoíkein mḕ en tôi kratêri phármaka memigména eíē. (perfect optative).
I was afraid that poisons might have been mixed in the mixing-bowl.

==== If by chance ====
A conditional clause of the type "if by chance it happens" (made with ἐάν (eán) + the subjunctive) becomes "if by chance it might happen" (εἰ (ei) + the optative) in past time, as in this example from the New Testament, which looks forward prospectively to a potential situation which might occur in the future relative to the main verb:

ἔσπευδεν γὰρ εἰ δυνατὸν εἴη αὐτῷ τὴν ἡμέραν τῆς πεντηκοστῆς γενέσθαι εἰς Ἱεροσόλυμα. (Acts)
éspeuden gàr ei dunatòn eíē autôi tḕn hēméran tês pentēkostês genésthai eis Hierosóluma. (present optative).
For he was in a hurry, if it might be possible for him to reach Jerusalem by the day of Pentecost.

=== Past time general clauses ===
In classical writers, the optative is frequently used in indefinite clauses in past time of the type introduced by the equivalent of words such as "whenever", "if ever", "wherever", "whatever" and so on, referring to repeated events in the past. In such clauses, when alternatives exist, the longer form of the conjunction (e.g. ὁπότε (hopóte) "whenever" rather than ὅτε (hóte) "when") is preferred.

Mostly the word for "whenever" is ὁπότε (hopóte), or occasionally ὁσάκις (hosákis), for example:

ὁπότε θύοι, ἐκάλει. (Xenophon)
hopóte thúoi, ekálei. (present optative).
Whenever he was making a sacrifice, he used to invite him.

ἐπειδὴ ἀνοιχθείη, εἰσῇμεν. (Plato)
epeidḕ anoikhtheíē, eisêimen. (aorist optative).
(Each day) after (the prison) was opened, we would go in.

The difference between the present and the aorist optative in the above examples is that when the aorist is used it implies that the first action took place and was completed before the second one began.

The optative mood can similarly be used after εἰ (ei) "if" in clauses of the type "if ever it happened":

εἴ πού τι ὁρῴη βρωτόν, διεδίδου. (Xenophon)
eí poú ti horṓiē brōtón, diedídou. (present optative).
If ever he saw something edible, he would distribute it.

οὐ προσίεσαν πρὸς τὸ πῦρ τοὺς ὀψίζοντας, εἰ μὴ μεταδοῖεν αὐτοῖς πῡρούς. (Xenophon)
ou prosī́esan pròs tò pûr toùs opsízontas, ei mḕ metadoîen autoîs pūroús (aorist optative).
They wouldn't let the late-comers come near the fire, unless they first shared some wheat with them.

The optative is similarly used in general relative clauses in past time, for example:

ἔπρᾱττεν ἃ δόξειεν αὐτῷ.
éprātten hà dóxeien autôi. (aorist optative).
He used to do whatever he pleased (lit. what seemed (best) to him).

ὅπου στρατοπεδεύοιντο, εὐθὺς ἔκοπτον [δένδρα]. (Xenophon)
hópou stratopedeúointo, euthùs ékopton [déndra]. (present optative).
Wherever they made a camp, they used to immediately chop down trees.

This type of "whenever" or "whoever" clause in past time with the optative does not seem to occur in the New Testament.

=== Indirect speech ===
In reported speech, the indicative in a direct quotation is usually replaced by the optative in an indirect quotation when the verb of saying is in a past tense ("said", "asked", etc.). The present optative stands for both the present and the imperfect indicative, and the perfect optative stands for both the perfect and the pluperfect. The future optative stands for the future, and its main use is in this construction.

ἔλεξαν ὅτι πέμψειε σφᾶς ὁ βασιλεύς. (Xenophon)
élexan hóti pémpseie sphâs ho basileús. (aorist optative).
They said that the king had sent them.

ἠρώτων αὐτοὺς τίνες εἶεν. (Xenophon)
ērṓtōn autoùs tínes eîen. (present optative).
They asked them who they were.

ὅ τι ποιήσοι οὐ διεσήμηνε. (Xenophon)
hó ti poiḗsoi ou diesḗmēne. (future optative).
He did not indicate what he was going to do.

In the following example, the perfect optative represents a perfect indicative in direct speech:

ἐλέχθη ὡς οἱ Πελοποννήσιοι φάρμακα ἐσβεβλήκοιεν ἐς τὰ φρέᾱτα. (Thucydides)
elékhthē hōs hoi Peloponnḗsioi phármaka esbeblḗkoien es tà phréāta. (perfect optative).
It was said that the Peloponnesians had thrown poisons into the wells.

However, the optative mood is not used after every past tense verb that introduces indirect statements. For example, after some verbs such as ἔφη (éphē) "he said" an infinitive is used for reported speech; after verbs of perceiving, such as ᾔσθετο (ḗistheto) "he noticed", a participle is often used.

In the New Testament the optative mood in indirect speech is found only in Luke and Acts (apart from one example in John 13:24, where the text is disputed), and it seems often to be used in indirect questions where there is an element of potentiality, for example:

ἐπηρώτων δὲ αὐτὸν ... τίς αὕτη εἴη ἡ παραβολή. (Luke)
epērṓtōn dè autòn ... tís haútē eíē hē parabolḗ. (present optative).
They asked him ... what might this parable be? (King James Version)

=== Contrary-to-fact clauses in the present (epic) ===
Homer uses the optative to express contrary-to-fact suppositions when they are imagined to occur in the present:

εἰ μέν τις τὸν ὄνειρον Ἀχαιῶν ἄλλος ἔνισπε ψεῦδός κεν φαῖμεν (Homer)
ei mén tis tòn óneiron Akhaiôn állos énispe pseûdós ken phaîmen. (present optative).
If any other Achaean had told of this dream, we would have thought it false.

Later dialects shifted to expressing such things using a past tense in the indicative.

== Koine and gradual extinction ==
Later, as Koine Greek emerged following the conquests of Alexander the Great c. 333 BC, the use of the optative began to wane among many Greek writers.

In the New Testament, the optative still occurs (mainly in Luke, Acts, and Paul), but it is rare. There are about 68 optatives among the 28,121 verbs in the New Testament – about 0.24%. Fifteen of these are the stereotyped phrase μὴ γένοιτο mḕ génoito "may it not happen!" (or "God forbid!"). It has been suggested that the frequent use of the optative in benedictions in the New Testament was due to a desire to make the language of such benedictions formal and thus appropriate for religious purposes.

In modern Greek the optative mood has entirely disappeared, leaving only the indicative, subjunctive and imperative moods.

== Morphology ==
Optative endings can be recognised because they contain οι, ει or αι. Regular ω-verbs and the verb εἶμι "I (will) go" have the endings -οιμι, -οις, -οι, while contracted verbs and other verbs have -ίην. The endings with -ίη- are usually found only in the singular, but sometimes in the plural also.

The order of the cells in the tables below is: first-person singular ("I"), second-person singular ("you"), third-person singular ("he", "she", or "it"), first-person plural ("we"), second-person plural ("you"), and third-person plural ("they").

A 2nd and 3rd person dual number (e.g. εἶτον "you both might be", εἴτην "they both might be") exists but is very rare. It is omitted from these tables.

optative	present							
optative	λῡ́ω	ποιέω	τιμάω	εἰμί	εἶμι	φημί	δίδωμι	οἶδα
active	λῡ́οιμι λῡ́οις λῡ́οι λῡ́οιμεν λῡ́οιτε λῡ́οιεν	ποιοίην ποιοίης ποιοίη, ποιοῖ ποιοῖμεν ποιοῖτε ποιοῖεν	τιμῴην τιμῴης τιμῴη τιμῷμεν τιμῷτε τιμῷεν	εἴην εἴης εἴη εἶμεν, εἴημεν εἶτε, εἴητε εἶεν, εἴησαν	ἴοιμι ἴοις ἴοι ἴοιμεν ἴοιτε ἴοιεν	φαίην φαίης φαίη φαῖμεν φαῖτε φαῖεν	διδοίην διδοίης διδοίη, διδοῖ διδοῖμεν διδοῖτε διδοῖεν	εἰδείην εἰδείης εἰδείη εἰδεῖμεν εἰδεῖτε εἰδεῖεν

optative	future		aorist				perfect
optative	λῡ́σω	ποιήσω	ἔλῡσα	ἔλαβον	ἔβην	ἔδωκα	λέλῠκα
active (cont.)	λῡ́σοιμι λῡ́σοις λῡ́σοι λῡ́σοιμεν λῡ́σοιτε λῡ́σοιεν	ποιήσοιμι ποιήσοις ποιήσοι ποιήσοιμεν ποιήσοιτε ποιήσοιεν	λῡ́σαιμι λῡ́σαις, λῡ́σειας λῡ́σαι, λῡ́σειε(ν) λῡ́σαιμεν λῡ́σαιτε λῡ́σαιεν, λῡ́σειαν	λάβοιμι λάβοις λάβοι λάβοιμεν λάβοιτε λάβοιεν	βαίην βαίης βαίη βαῖμεν βαῖτε βαῖεν	δοίην δοίης δοίη, δῴη δοῖμεν δοῖτε δοῖεν	λελύκοιμι λελύκοις λελύκοι λελύκοιμεν λελύκοιτε λελύκοιεν, λελυκότες εἶεν

- βαίνω "I go" is almost always used with a prefix (e.g. δια-, κατα-, συμ- etc.) except in poetry.
- σταίην "I might stand" from ἵστημι and γνοίην "I might know" from γιγνώσκω go the same way as βαίην and δοίην.

optative	present		future		aorist		perfect
optative	λῡ́ομαι	ποιέομαι	λῡ́σομαι	ἔσομαι	ἐλῡσάμην	ἐγενόμην	λέλῠμαι
middle	λῡοίμην λῡ́οιο λῡ́οιτο λῡοίμεθα λῡ́οισθε λῡ́οιντο	ποιοίμην ποιοῖο ποιοῖτο ποιοίμεθα ποιοῖσθε ποιοῖντο	λῡσοίμην λῡ́σοιο λῡ́σοιτο λῡσοίμεθα λῡ́σοισθε λῡ́σοιντο	ἐσοίμην ἔσοιο ἔσοιτο ἐσοίμεθα ἔσοισθε ἔσοιντο	λῡσαίμην λῡ́σαιο λῡ́σαιτο λῡσαίμεθα λῡ́σαισθε λῡ́σαιντο	γενοίμην γένοιο γένοιτο γενοίμεθα γένοισθε γένοιντο	λελυμένος εἴην λελυμένος εἴης λελυμένος εἴη λελυμένοι εἶμεν λελυμένοι εἶτε λελυμένοι εἶεν

optative	present		future	aorist	perfect
optative	λῡ́ομαι	ποιέομαι	λῠθήσομαι	ἐλύθην	λέλῠμαι
passive	λῡοίμην λῡ́οιο λῡ́οιτο λῡοίμεθα λῡ́οισθε λῡ́οιντο	ποιοίμην ποιοῖο ποιοῖτο ποιοίμεθα ποιοῖσθε ποιοῖντο	λυθησοίμην λυθήσοιο λυθήσοιτο λυθησοίμεθα λυθήσοισθε λυθήσοιντο	λῠθείην λυθείης λυθείη λυθεῖμεν, λυθείημεν λυθεῖτε, λυθείητε λυθεῖεν, λυθείησαν	λελυμένος εἴην λελυμένος εἴης λελυμένος εἴη λελυμένοι εἶμεν λελυμένοι εἶτε λελυμένοι εἶεν

- The strong aorist (2nd aorist) forms βλαβείην "I might be harmed" and φανείην "I might appear" have endings similar to λυθείην.
