= Genitive construction =

Type of grammatical construction

In grammar, a genitive construction or genitival construction is a type of grammatical construction used to express a relation between two nouns such as the possession of one by another (e.g. "John's jacket"), or some other type of connection (e.g. "John's father" or "the father of John"). A genitive construction involves two nouns, the head (or modified noun) and the dependent (or modifier noun).

In dependent-marking languages, a dependent genitive noun modifies the head by expressing some property of it. For example, in the construction "John's jacket", "jacket" is the head and "John's" is the modifier, expressing a property of the jacket (it is owned by John). The analogous relationship in head-marking languages is pertensive.

== Methods of construction ==
Genitive constructions can be expressed in various ways:

=== By placing the dependent noun in the genitive case ===
This is common in languages with grammatical case such as Latin. For example, "Cicero's father" is expressed by pater Cicerōnis or Cicerōnis pater, where the dependent noun "Cicero" (Latin Cicerō) is placed in the genitive case (Latin Cicerōnis) and then placed either before or after the head noun (pater "father"). A similar construction occurs in formal German such as in das Buch des Mannes "the man's book", where das Buch means "the book" and des Mannes is the genitive case of der Mann "the man".

=== Using an adposition or other linking word ===
This is common in languages without grammatical case, as well as in some languages with vestigial case systems.

1. English uses the preposition "of" to express many genitival constructions, e.g. "the father of John" or "the capital of the nation".
2. Informal German also prefers a preposition, except with proper names, e.g. der Vater von meinem Freund "My friend's father" (lit. "the father of my friend") but Johanns Vater "John's father".
3. Mandarin Chinese uses the linking word de 的, e.g. Yuēhàn de fùqīn 约翰的父亲 "John's father", where Yuēhàn means "John" and fùqīn means "father". The word de in Chinese is not a preposition (for example, Chinese prepositions precede their dependent nouns, just as in English) but rather a special particle with its own syntax (a bit like the "'s" modifier in English).
4. Japanese similarly uses no の, e.g. Jon no chichi ジョンの父 "John's father".
5. Malay trade and creole languages of Eastern Indonesia use descendants of punya "to have" (pe, pu, or pung depending on the variety) as the linking word between head and the dependent.
6. Turkish uses -in/-ın/-ün, e.g. Ayşe'nin kedisi "Ayşe's cat".

In some languages, the linking word agrees in gender and number with the head (sometimes with the dependent or occasionally with both). In such cases, it shades into the "his genitive" (see below).

1. In Egyptian Arabic, for example, the word bitāʕ "of" agrees with the head noun (masculine bitāʕ, feminine bitāʕit, plural bitūʕ), e.g.
  - il-wālid bitāʕ Yaḥyā "John's father" (Yaḥyā is Arabic for "John")
  - il-wālida b(i)tāʕit Yaḥyā "John's mother"
  - il-wālidēn bitūʕ Yaḥyā "John's parents".
2. Hindi is similar and uses the postpositions kā/kē/kī (का / के / की), which agree in case, gender and number with the head noun, e.g.
  - Jôn kā bēṭā — जॉन का बेटा — John's son (nom. sg.)
  - Jôn kē bēṭē — जॉन के बेटे — John's sons / John's son (nom. pl. / obl. sg.)
  - Jôn kē bēṭō̃ — जॉन के बेटों — John's sons (obl. pl.)
  - Jôn kī bēṭī — जॉन की बेटी — John's daughter (nom. sg. / obl. sg.)
  - Jôn kī bēṭiyā̃ — जॉन की बेटियाँ — John's daughter (nom. pl.)
  - Jôn kī bēṭiyō̃ — जॉन की बेटियों — John's daughters (obl. pl.)

=== Using a clitic ===
For example, the English so-called "Saxon genitive" (the "'s" modifier, as in "John's father" or "the King of Spain's house"). The two genitive constructions in English (using "of" and "'s") are not synonymous. In some cases, both can be used ("John's father", "the father of John"; "the capital of the nation", "the nation's capital"), but some constructions feel natural one way but awkward or ungrammatical if they are expressed the other way. They may even have a different meaning ("I found John's coat" but not I found the coat of John; "We need to encourage the love of music" but not We need to encourage music's love).

Sometimes, the seemingly-discordant construction may be the right one, such as in the idiom will be the death of (e.g. "She'll be the death of me", meaning something close to "She'll be my downfall"; even though the latter sentence uses a possessive pronoun, the former uses a prepositional genitive).

A construction called the double genitive is also used to precisely denote possession and resolve ambiguity in some cases. For example, the phrase "this is a picture of John's" denotes that the picture is owned by John but does not necessarily feature John. By comparison, "this is a picture of John" indicates that the picture features John, and "this is John's picture" ambiguously indicates that either John owns the picture or that the picture features John. However, this construction is also considered to be either informal or not part of Standard English.

The distinction between the use of a clitic and a preposition/linking word is not always clear. For example, the Japanese particle no の "of" is sometimes analyzed as a clitic. The particle no could alternatively be considered as either a particle or as a suffix.

=== Using the "his genitive" ===
In the 1600s, this construction sometimes occurred in English such as in Ben Jonson's play Sejanus His Fall (i.e. "Sejanus's Fall"). It is standard in Afrikaans and common in spoken language: dem Mann sein Haus "the man's house" (literally "to the man, his house"). This construction can be seen as a variation of the above use of a linking word that agrees with the dependent. In some languages, this construction has shifted to the more normal situation to agree linking words by having agreement with the head, as in colloquial Norwegian Hilde sitt hus "Hilde's house" (lit. "Hilde her[REFLEXIVE] house" in which the possessive pronoun agrees with the head, rather than the modifier; in this case, hus "house" is neuter). In this case, the reflexive form of the possessive pronoun is used to refer to the immediate possessor (Hilde), not necessarily the subject of the sentence, as would otherwise be the case.

A variant of this construction appears in Hungarian language, which uses suffixes, unlike the Germanic languages, which use possessive pronouns. That results in constructions like a ház ablaka "the house's window", literally "the house window-its". A similar but more dated form may occur in Norwegian as well in which the above example may be expressed as huset hennes Hilde (lit. "house-the her Hilde", with the non-reflexive possessive pronoun and reversed word order), with the same meaning as before. However, that variant is restricted to cases in which the possessor is a personal name or a familiar relation such as "father", and the equivalent of the Hungarian example would become ungrammatical: *vinduet dets hus (lit. "window-the its house").

In Pirahã, spoken in the Amazonia, in Brazil, pronouns do not inflect for possession and are used in a way that is similar to the English -s:

paitá hi kaiíi
Paita (s)he house
"Paita's house"

ti kahaí
I arrow
"my arrow"

=== Using a possessive adjective ===
NOTE: In this context, this is not the same as a possessive determiner such as "my" or "his".

In Russian, for example, most nouns have a corresponding adjective that is declined as a normal adjective and so agrees with its head noun, but it has the meaning of a genitival modifier. For example, it is used in place of a normal construction that uses a noun in the genitive case:

детство Иван-а
childhood(NEUT).NOM Ivan-GEN
"Ivan's childhood"

It is also possible to use a possessive adjective, which agrees with the head for number, gender and case:

Иван-ов-о детство
Ivan-POS.ADJ-NEUT.NOM childhood(NEUT).NOM
"Ivan's childhood"

Latin also had possessive adjectives of this sort. Sometimes, they are called relational adjectives although that term is also used for a slightly different type of adjective in Russian.

=== Using suffixaufnahme ===
Suffixaufnahme is used in some languages and is conceptually similar to the use of possessive adjectives. Basically, a modifying noun is marked in the genitive case but agrees also for case, number and gender with the head. Essentially, it thus has two case markings. It occurs in modern languages like Dyirbal and also ancient langues like Old Georgian:

perx-ni k'ac-isa-ni
foot-NOM.PL man-GEN-NOM.PL
"the man's feet"

=== By placing the head noun in a special case ===
This is the opposite, in some sense, to the normal usage of the genitive case since it is the head noun, rather than the dependent, that is marked. The form is common in the Semitic languages in which the head noun is placed in the so-called construct state and forms a close syntactic construction with a following dependent noun. For example, in Hebrew, the noun bayit "house" assumes the special form bet in the construct state, as in bet ha-yeled "the child's house" (where ha-yeled means "the child"). Typically, the special form is shorter than the original, and no other modifier (e.g. adjective) can intervene between head and dependent. (In Biblical Hebrew, the entire construct was pronounced phonologically as a single word, with no stress on the construct-state noun; that triggered sound changes associated with unstressed syllables, which typically shortened the construct-state noun.)

Classical Arabic has a similar construction, but the dependent noun is placed also in the genitive case:

muʿallim-ū l-walad-i
teacher-NOM.PL.CONSTRUCT the-child-GEN
"the child's teachers"

In this case, the word muʿallimūna "teachers" assumes the construct-state form muʿallimū, and (a)l-waladu "the child" assumes the genitive case (a)l-waladi. No adjective can intervene between head and dependent. Instead, an adjective such as "good" must follow the entire construction, regardless of whether the intended meaning is "the good child's teachers" or "the child's good teachers". (Gender, number and case agreement of the adjective often distinguishes the two possibilities.)

== See also ==
- Genitive case
- Construct state
- Suffixaufnahme
- His genitive
- Saxon genitive
