= Mutatis mutandis =

Medieval Latin phrase

Mutatis mutandis is a Medieval Latin phrase meaning "with things changed that should be changed" or "once the necessary changes have been made", literally: having been changed, going to be changed. It is used in law, economics, mathematics, linguistics and philosophy to acknowledge that a comparison being made requires certain obvious alterations, which are left unstated. In logic, it is encountered when discussing counterfactuals, as a shorthand for all the initial and derived changes which have been previously discussed.

It is not to be confused with the similar ceteris paribus, which excludes any changes other than those explicitly mentioned.

== Latin ==
The phrase mutatis mutandis—now sometimes written mūtātīs mūtandīs to show vowel length—does not appear in surviving classical literature. It is Medieval Latin in origin and the feet of fines, kept at The National Archives (United Kingdom), contains its first use in England on January 20, 1270, at Pedes Finium, 54 Hen. III, Salop.

Both words are participles of the Latin verb mutare ('to move; to change; to exchange'). Mutatus, -a, -um is its perfect passive participle ('changed; having been changed'). Mutandus, -a, -um is its gerundive, which functions both as a future passive participle ('to be changed; going to be changed') and as a verbal adjective or noun expressing necessity ('needing to be changed; things needing to be changed'). The phrase is an ablative absolute, using the ablative case to show that the clause is grammatically independent ('absolute' literally meaning 'dissolved' or 'separated') from the rest of the sentence.

== English ==
Mutatis mutandis was first borrowed into English in the 16th century, but continues to be italicized as a foreign phrase. Although many similar adverbial phrases are treated as part of the sentence, mutatis mutandis is usually set apart by commas or in some other fashion. The nearest English equivalent to an ablative absolute is the nominative absolute, so that a literal translation will either use the nominative case ("things changed which are to be changed") or a preposition ("with things to be changed having been changed"). More often, the idea is expressed more tersely ("with the necessary changes") or using subordinating conjunctions and a dependent clause ("once the necessary adjustments are made").

The phrase has a technical meaning in mathematics where it is sometimes used to signal that a proof can be more generally applied to other certain cases after making some, presumably obvious, changes. It serves a similar purpose to the more common phrase, "without loss of generality" (WLOG).

The legal use of the term is somewhat specialized. As glossed by Shira Scheindlin, judge for the Southern District of New York, for a 1998 case: "This Latin phrase simply means that the necessary changes in details, such as names and places, will be made but everything else will remain the same." In the wake of the Plain English movements, some countries attempted to replace their law codes' legal Latin with English equivalents.

=== Examples ===
- "I believe the soul in Paradise must enjoy something nearer to a perpetual vigorous adulthood than to any other state we know. At least that is my hope. Not that Paradise could disappoint, but I believe Boughton is right to enjoy the imagination of heaven as the best pleasure of this world. I don't see how he can be entirely wrong, approaching it that way. I certainly don't mind the thought of your mother finding me a strong young man. There is neither male nor female, they neither marry nor are given in marriage, but, mutatis mutandis, it would be a fine thing. That mutandis! Such a burden on one word!"—Marilynne Robinson, Gilead.
- "To illustrate the point with trivial stereotypical examples from British society: just as male heterosexuals are free to enjoy themselves playing rugby, drinking beer and talking about girls with their mates, so male homosexuals are to be free to enjoy themselves going to Kylie concerts, drinking exotically coloured cocktails and talking about boys with their straight female mates. Mutatis mutandis—and in many cases the adaptations would obviously be great—the same must apply to other societies. In other words, gay men are to be as free as their straight equivalents in the society concerned to live their lives in the way that is natural to them as gay men, without the fear of persecution."—Lord Rodger of Earlsferry, HJ and HT v Home Secretary, British Supreme Court, 2010

== Other languages ==
The phrase appears in other European languages as well. A passage of Marcel Proust's À la recherche du temps perdu includes "...j'ai le fils d'un de mes amis qui, mutatis mutandis, est comme vous..." ("A friend of mine has a son whose case, mutatis mutandis, is very much like yours.") The German Ministry of Justice, similar to the Plain English advocates above, now eschews its use. Their official English translation of the Civil Code now reads:

"Section 27 (Appointment of and management by the board). ...(3) The management by the board is governed by the provisions on mandate in sections 664 to 670 with the necessary modifications."

== In popular culture ==
In Marvel Comics' X-Men series, the phrase is used as the motto of Xavier's School for Gifted Youngsters.

== See also ==
- Dependent and independent variables
- List of Latin phrases
- Nunc pro tunc ("now for then", legal term with similar effect)
- Substitution
