= English possessive =

Possessive words and phrases in the English language

In English, possessive words or phrases exist for nouns and most pronouns, as well as some noun phrases. These can sometimes play the roles of determiners (also called possessive adjectives when corresponding to a pronoun) or of nouns.

For nouns, noun phrases, and some pronouns, the possessive is generally formed with the suffix -'s, but in some cases just with the addition of an apostrophe to an existing s. This form is sometimes called the Saxon genitive, reflecting the suffix's derivation from Old English. However, personal pronouns have irregular possessives that do not use an apostrophe, such as its, and most of them have different forms for possessive determiners and possessive pronouns, such as my and mine or your and yours.

Possessives are one of the means by which genitive constructions are formed in modern English, the other principal one being the use of the preposition of. It is sometimes stated that the possessives represent a grammatical case, called the genitive or possessive case; however, some linguists do not accept this view and regard the 's ending as either a phrasal affix, an edge affix, or a clitic, rather than as a case ending.

== Formation of possessive construction ==
=== Nouns and noun phrases ===
The possessive form of an English noun or noun phrase is made by suffixing a morpheme represented orthographically as 's (pronounced the same as the regular plural ending (e)s: namely, as /ɪz/ when following a sibilant sound (/s/, /z/, /ʃ/, /ʒ/, /tʃ/ or /dʒ/), as /s/ when following any other voiceless consonant (/p/, /t/, /k/, /f/, /θ/, or /x/), and as /z/ otherwise. For example:

- Mitch /mɪtʃ/ has the possessive Mitch's /ˈmɪtʃɪz/
- luck /lʌk/ has the possessive luck's /lʌks/
- man /mæn/ has the singular possessive man's /mænz/ and the plural possessive men's /mɛnz/ (Note: An example of nouns with an irregular plural, highlighting the difference with their singular possessive: man's vs. men, wife's vs. wives, etc.)

A plural noun ending in -s only adds the apostrophe (for example: Peasants' Revolt) and retains the unmarked plural pronunciation (peasants and peasants' both //). A singular noun ending in -s (or -z in another sibilant -z or -x sound; or -se, -ze, -ce or -xe: example, Verreaux's eagle), is traditionally also spelled by adding only an apostrophe (despite often being pronounced distinctly):

- the possessive of cats is cats', both forms being pronounced /kæts/
- the possessive of James is spelled James's and pronounced with the additional syllable -/zɪz/, but the possessive of Jesus is usually Jesus' and pronounced /ˈdʒiːzəs/.

Singular nouns ending in s also form a possessive regularly by adding 's, as in Charles's /ˈtʃɑːrlzɪz/ or the boss's. The Chicago Manual of Style recommends this style while stating that just an apostrophe (e.g. Jesus') is also correct. The Associated Press Stylebook recommends the s's style for nouns other than proper nouns, but only if the following word does not begin with s. The Elements of Style and the Canadian Press Stylebook prefer the form of s's with the exception of Biblical and classical proper names (Jesus' teachings, Augustus' guards) and common phrases that do not take the extra syllabic s (e.g. "for goodness' sake"). For more on style guidance for this and other issues relating to the construction of possessives in English, see possessive apostrophe.

The 's morpheme is attached to the last word of a noun phrase, whether or not that is its head noun. For example, the phrase the king of Spain forms the possessive the king of Spain's, and – in informal style – the phrase the man we saw yesterday can form the man we saw yesterday's. But co-ordinate nouns may each be marked or only the last: John's and Laura's house and John and Laura's house are correct, though the latter is more common, especially in idiomatic speech. See § Status of the possessive as a grammatical case below.

=== Pronouns ===
Unlike other noun phrases which only have a single possessive form, personal pronouns in English have two possessive forms: possessive determiners (used to form noun phrases such as "her success") and possessive pronouns (used in place of nouns as a subject or object, as in "Hers is better", "I prefer hers", or as a predicate pronoun, as in "the success was hers"). In most cases, these are different from each other.

For example, the pronoun I has possessive determiner my and possessive pronoun mine; you has your and yours; while he has his for both; she has her and hers; while it has its for both; we has our and ours; they has their and theirs. The archaic thou has thy and thine. For a full table and further details, see English personal pronouns.

The possessive its has no apostrophe, although it is sometimes written with one in error (see hypercorrection) by confusion with the common possessive ending -'s and the contraction it's used for it is and it has. Possessive its was originally formed with an apostrophe in the 17th century, but it had been dropped by the early 19th century, presumably on the pattern of the apostrophe being omitted from personal possessive pronouns.

The interrogative and relative pronoun who has the possessive whose. In its relative use, whose can also refer to inanimate antecedents, but its interrogative use always refers to persons.

Other pronouns that form possessives (mainly indefinite pronouns) do so in the same way as nouns, with 's, for example one's, somebody's (and somebody else's). Certain pronouns, such as the common demonstratives this, that, these, and those, do not form their possessives using 's; instead, of this, of that, etc. are used.

English possessive pronouns agree with the gender of their antecedent or referent, whereas in other languages, such as Italian, the possessive pronoun agrees with the gender of the head noun of the noun phrase in which it appears. To exemplify these differences, compare he loved his mother, in which his is masculine in agreement with he, to ama sua madre, in which sua is feminine in agreement with madre (mother).

== Syntactic functions of possessive words or phrases ==
English possessives play two principal roles in syntax:

- the role of possessive determiners (more popularly called possessive adjectives; see Possessive § Terminology) standing before a noun, as in my house or John's two sisters;
- the role of possessive pronouns (although they may not always be called that), standing independently in place of a noun, as in mine is large; they prefer John's.

=== As determiners ===
Possessive noun phrases such as "John's" can be used as determiners. When a form corresponding to a personal pronoun is used as a possessive determiner, the correct form must be used, as described above (my rather than mine, etc.).

Possessive determiners are not used in combination with articles or other definite determiners. For example, it is not correct to say *the my hat, (Note: This article uses asterisks to indicate ungrammatical examples.) *a my hat or *this my hat; an alternative is provided in the last two cases by the "double genitive" as described in the following section – a hat of mine (also one of my hats), this hat of mine. Possessive determiners can nonetheless be combined with certain quantifiers, as in my six hats (which differs in meaning from six of my hats). See English determiners for more details.

A possessive adjective can be intensified with the word own, which can itself be either an adjective or a pronoun: my own (bed), John's own (bed).

In some expressions the possessive has itself taken on the role of a noun modifier, as in cow's milk (used rather than cow milk). It then no longer functions as a determiner; adjectives and determiners can be placed before it, as in the warm cow's milk, where idiomatically the and warm now refer to the milk, not to the cow.

Possessive relationships can also be expressed periphrastically, by preceding the noun or noun phrase with the preposition of, although possessives are usually more idiomatic where a true relationship of possession is involved. Some examples:

- the child's bag might also be expressed as the bag of the child
- our cats' mother might be expressed as the mother of our cats
- the system's failure might be expressed as the failure of the system

Another alternative in the last case may be the system failure, using system as a noun adjunct rather than a possessive – this is common when the possessor is more abstract in character.

=== As pronouns ===
Possessives can also play the role of nouns or pronouns; namely they can stand alone as a noun phrase, without qualifying a noun. In this role they can function as the subject or object of verbs, or as a complement of prepositions. When a form corresponding to a personal pronoun is used in this role, the correct form must be used, as described above (mine rather than my, etc.).

Examples:

- I'll do my work, and you do yours. (here yours is a possessive pronoun, meaning "your work", and standing as the object of the verb do)
- My car is old, Mary's is new. (here Mary's means "Mary's car" and stands as the subject of its clause)
- Your house is nice, but I prefer to stay in mine. (here mine means "my house", and is the complement of the preposition in)

=== Double genitive ===
The genitive can be combined with an of construction to produce what is often called a double genitive, as in the following examples:

- an officer/Of the prefectes (Chaucer The Second Nun's Tale, lines 368-369; in Modern English an officer of the prefect's)
- that hard heart of thine (Venus and Adonis, line 500)
- this extreme exactness of his (Sterne, Tristram Shandy, chapter 1.IV)
- that poor mother of mine (Thackeray, Barry Lyndon, chapter I) and uses of the title Mother of Mine,
- Any Friend of Nicholas Nickleby's is a Friend of Mine, and frequent uses of the title Friend of Mine
- a picture of the king's (that is, a picture owned by the king, as distinct from a picture of the king – a picture in which the king is portrayed)

Some object to the name double genitive because the "of" clause is not a genitive. Alternative names are "oblique genitive", "post-genitive", "cumulative genitive", "pleonastic genitive", and "double possessive".

Some writers have stigmatized this usage. However, it has a history in careful English. "Moreover, in some sentences the double genitive offers the only way to express what is meant. There is no substitute for it in a sentence such as That's the only friend of yours that I've ever met, since sentences such as That's your only friend that I've ever met and That's your only friend, whom I've ever met are not grammatical." Cf. "That's the only one of your friends that I've ever met" "[T]he construction is confined to human referents: compare a friend of the Gallery / no fault of the Gallery."

The Oxford English Dictionary says that this usage was "Originally partitive, but subseq[uently became a] ... simple possessive ... or as equivalent to an appositive phrase ...".

=== Nested possessive ===
Because a possessive is itself a determiner phrase, possessives can be nested arbitrarily deep, as in Lincoln's Doctor's Dog or *John's friend's mother's ... lawyer's brother.

=== Subject complements ===
When they are used as subject complements, as in this is mine and that pen is John's, the intended sense may be either that of a predicate pronoun or of a predicate adjective; however, their form (mine, yours, etc.) in this case is the same as that used in other sentences for possessive pronouns.

=== Use of whose ===
The following sentences illustrate the uses of whose:

- As the possessive of interrogative who: Whose pen is this? Whose do you prefer? For whose good are we doing it?
- As the possessive of relative who (normally only as determiner, not pronoun): There is the man whose pen we broke. She is the woman in whose garden we found you.
- As the possessive of relative which (again, normally only as determiner): It is an idea whose time has come (preferably to ...of which the time has come); . . . chariots whose wheels were fitted into holes in the grave floor

== Semantics ==
Possessives, as well as their synonymous constructions with of, express a range of relationships that are not limited strictly to possession in the sense of ownership. Some discussion of such relationships can be found at Possession (linguistics) and at Possessive § Semantics. Some points as they relate specifically to English are discussed below.

=== Actions ===
When possessives are used with a verbal noun or other noun expressing an action, the possessive may represent either the doer of the action (the subject of the corresponding verb) or the undergoer of the action (the object of the verb). The same applies to of phrases. When a possessive and an of phrase are used with the same action noun, the former generally represents the subject and the latter the object. For example:

- Fred's dancing (or the dancing of Fred) – Fred is the dancer (only possible meaning with this verb)
- the proposal's rejection or the rejection of the proposal – the proposal is rejected
- Fred's rejection of the proposal – Fred is the rejecter, the proposal is rejected

When a gerundive phrase acts as the object of a verb or preposition, the agent/subject of the gerund may be possessive or not, reflecting two different but equally valid interpretations of the phrase's structure:

- I object to Ralph destroying the barn. (Ralph is the subject of the gerundive verb "destroying".)
- I object to Ralph's destroying the barn. (Ralph is the genitive of the verbal noun "destroying".)

=== Time periods ===
Time periods are sometimes put into possessive form, to express the duration of or time associated with the modified noun:

- the Hundred Years' War
- a day's pay
- two weeks' notice

The paraphrase with of is often un-idiomatic or ambiguous in these cases.

=== Expressing for ===
Sometimes the possessive expresses for whom something is intended, rather than to whom it physically belongs:

- women's shoes
- children's literature

These cases would be paraphrased with for rather than of (shoes for women).

=== Appositive genitive ===
Sometimes genitive constructions are used to express a noun in apposition to the main one, as in the Isle of Man, the problem of drug abuse. This may be occasionally be done with a possessive (as in Dublin's fair city, for the fair city of Dublin), but this is a rare usage.

== History ==
The 's clitic originated in Old English as an inflexional suffix marking genitive case. In the modern language, it can often be attached to the end of an entire phrase (as in "The king of Spain's wife" or "The man whom you met yesterday's bicycle"). As a result, it is normally viewed by linguists as a clitic – that is, a morpheme that has syntactic characteristics of a word, but depends phonologically on another word or phrase.

An identical form of the clitic exists in the North Germanic languages, and in the North Frisian sister language of Old English. But the accepted linguistic history of the clitic possessive in these languages is very different.

In Old English, -es was the ending of the genitive singular of most strong declension nouns and the masculine and neuter genitive singular of strong adjectives. The ending -e was used for strong nouns with Germanic ō-stems, which constituted most of the feminine strong nouns, and for the feminine genitive singular form of strong adjectives.

Gender		Singular	Plural
Strong	masculine	-es	-a
Strong	feminine	-e	-a
Strong	neuter	-es	-a
Weak	m. / f. / n.	-an	-ena

In Middle English the es ending was generalised to the genitive of all strong declension nouns. By the sixteenth century, the remaining strong declension endings were generalized to all nouns. The spelling es remained, but in many words the letter e no longer represented a sound. In those words, printers often copied the French practice of substituting an apostrophe for the letter e. In later use, 's was used for all nouns where the /s/ sound was used for the possessive form, and when adding 's to a word like love the e was no longer omitted. The 's form was also used for plural noun forms. These were derived from the strong declension as ending in Old English. In Middle English, the spelling was changed to -es, reflecting a change in pronunciation, and extended to all cases of the plural, including the genitive. Later conventions removed the apostrophe from subjective and objective case forms and added it after the s in possessive case forms. See Apostrophe: Historical development

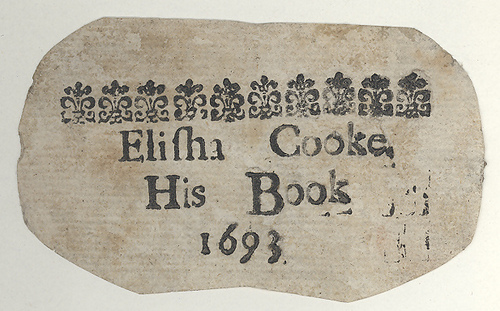
A bookplate of 1693, using "his"

In the Early Modern English of 1580 to 1620 it was sometimes spelled as "his" as a folk etymology, e.g. "St. James his park"; see his genitive.

The verse Genesis 9:6 shows the development. The Wycliffe Bible (1395) contains the word "mannus" ("Who euere schedith out mannus blood, his blood schal be sched; for man is maad to the ymage of God."). In the original King James Bible (1611) there is "mans" ("Who so sheddeth mans blood, by man shall his blood be shed: for in the image of God made he man."). In the plural, the 1611 King James has mens, but the older Wycliffe Bible uses of men.

Another remnant of the Old English genitive is the adverbial genitive, where the ending s (without apostrophe) forms adverbs of time: nowadays, closed Sundays. There is a literary periphrastic form using of, as in of a summer day. There are also forms in -ce, from genitives of number and place: once, twice, thrice; whence, hence, thence.

There is also the "genitive of measure": forms such as "a five-mile journey" and "a ten-foot pole" use what is actually a remnant of the Old English genitive plural which, ending in /a/, had neither the final /s/ nor underwent the foot/feet vowel mutation of the nominative plural. In essence, the underlying forms are "a five of miles (O.E. gen. pl. mīla) journey" and "a ten of feet (O.E. gen. pl. fōta) pole".

== Status of the possessive as a grammatical case ==
Historically, the possessive morpheme represented by 's was a case marker, as noted in the previous section, and the modern English possessive can also be analysed as a grammatical case, called the "possessive case" or "genitive case". However, it differs from the noun inflection of languages such as German, in that in phrases like the king of England's horse the ending is separated from the head noun (king) and attaches to the last word of the phrase. To account for this, the possessive can be analysed, for instance, as a clitic construction (an "enclitic postposition") or as an inflection of the last word of a phrase ("edge inflection").

For instance,

- The Oxford English Grammar, under the heading "Case", states "In speech the genitive is signalled in singular nouns by an inflection that has the same pronunciation variants as for plural nouns in the common case."
- A Comprehensive Grammar of the English Language, under the heading "The forms of the genitive inflection", similarly refers to the "genitive inflection with regular and irregular plurals", but later – especially with regard to the "group genitive" – revises this to clarify that the -s ending is not a case ending as in German or Latin but is "more appropriately described as an enclitic postposition".
- The Cambridge Grammar of the English Language discusses the possessive in greater detail, taking account of group (or phrasal) genitives like the King of England's and somebody else's and analyses the construction as an inflection of the final word of the phrase (as opposed to the head noun). The discussion in support of this inflectional analysis includes:
  - the personal pronouns, where "no other analysis is possible",
  - the fact that the genitive 's cannot stand alone, unlike 'm in I'm, which can be expanded to am
  - the varying form of the genitive suffix (/ɪz/, /z/, /s/) depending on "the phonological properties of the base to which it attaches"
  - the sensitivity of the genitive formation to the internal morphological structure of the noun.

Other views are (1) that the possessive can be regarded as having elements of an affix and elements of a clitic, which are seen as idealized categories, and (2) that the possessive form can be an affix or a clitic, but only one of the two in any given example.
