= Accusative absolute =

Grammatical construction

The accusative absolute is a grammatical construction found in some languages. It is an absolute construction found in the accusative case.

== Greek ==
In ancient Greek, the accusative case is used adverbially with participles of impersonal verbs, similarly to the genitive absolute. For example:

συνδόξαν τῷ πατρὶ καὶ τῇ μητρὶ γαμεῖ τὴν Κυαξάρου θυγατέρα
sundóxan tôi patrì kaì têi mētrì gameî tḕn Kuaxárou thugatéra
{seeming good-ACC} the-MASC.DAT.SG father-DAT and the-FEM.DAT.SG mother-DAT marries the-FEM.ACC.SG Cyaxares-GEN daughter-ACC
"It seeming good to his father and mother, he marries the daughter of Cyaxares." (Xenophon, Cyropaedia 8.5.28)

== German ==
In German, a noun phrase can be put in the accusative to indicate that the sentence's subject has the property it describes. For example:

Neben ihm saß der dünnhaarige Pianist, den Kopf im Nacken, und lauschte.
{next to} him sat the thin-haired pianist the-MASC.ACC.SG head {in the} neck and listened
"The thin-haired pianist, his head back (lit. his head in his neck), sat next to him and listened."

== Latin ==
The accusative absolute is sometimes found in place of the ablative absolute in the Latin of Late Antiquity as, for example, in the writings of Gregory of Tours and Jordanes. This likely arose when the pronunciations of the ablative and accusative singulars merged, since the final -m of the accusative singular was no longer pronounced, having been fading since the Classical era. The accusative absolute is also found with plural nouns whose ablative and accusative are not similar in pronunciation.
