= Suffixaufnahme =

Phenomenon in linguistics

Suffixaufnahme (German: [ˈzʊfɪksˌʔaʊ̯fˌnaːmə], "suffix resumption"), also known as case stacking, is a linguistic phenomenon used in forming a genitive construction, whereby prototypically a genitive noun agrees with its head noun. The term Suffixaufnahme itself is literally translated as "taking up of suffixes", which can be interpreted as the identical case marking of different but referentially-related phrases, with the presumption that nominal phrases possess a flat or non-configurational syntax.

Across syntactic theories, case is seen as a bundle of features and case agreement as the identity of case features. It was first recognized in Old Georgian and some other Caucasian and ancient Middle Eastern languages as well as many Australian languages and almost invariably coincides with agglutinativity.

The use of case stacking is not limited to genitive constructions although the genitive case is involved in the majority of occurrences across languages. Cross-linguistic variations in case stacking representation and functions can be found. In general, case stacking describes the phenomenon whereby a single word may bear multiple cases reflecting its relation to a number of different syntactic elements. It is important in the development of theories of inflectional morphology and the establishment of the relation between morphology and syntax.

== Examples ==
=== Kayardild ===
In Kayardild, the combination of adnominal cases (ablative and genitive) in possessor-like functions, and various relational and adverbial (e.g., spatial) cases is common. Case functions may be combined where ablative functions similar to a genitive adnominal case, and the instrumental case is applied to the entire noun phrase (NP), as can be seen in the following example:

dan-kinaba-nguni dangka-naba-nguni mirra-nguni walbu-nguni
this-ABL-INS man-ABL-INS good-INS raft-INS
'with this man's good raft' (Evans 1995: 105)

From this example, all words of the relevant phrase share the case marking which is assigned to the phrase as a whole, namely, the instrumental case. This follows Evans's (1995) total concord principle, which states that case inflections are distributed over all sub-constituents regardless of the level they are originated from (i.e., the head or its dependents).

A similar example can be illustrated:

Maku-ntha yalawu-jarra-ntha yakuri-naa-ntha dangka-karra-nguni-naa-ntha mijil-nguni-naa-ntha
woman-OBL catch-PAST-OBL fish-MABL-OBL man-GEN-INST-MABL-OBL net-INST-MABL-OBL
'The woman must have caught fish with the man's net.' (Kracht 2003: 37)

In this example, every item is marked by the oblique case (OBL), which indicates the non–indicative mood. The object is marked with the modal ablative case (MABL) and the instrumental adjunct by the instrumental (INST), and the possessor phrase by an additional genitive (GEN) as well.

In addition, Kayardild also has a system of modal (i.e., aspect-mood) cases, which involves the use of the same case suffixes found in the adnominal and adverbial systems. Non-subject NPs are marked for a case category that is determined by the aspect-mood domain they are in. For example, if the verb has the past suffixal inflection, all non-subject nouns then bear the modal ablative case (MABL).

birangkarra bi-l-da mardala-tha dangka-walath-i, ngimi-marra-y
long.time 3-PL-NOM paint-ACT man-a.lot-MLOC night-UTIL-MLOC
'They have been painting the men for a long time, getting ready for (the dance) tonight.' (Evans 1995: 109)

The modal locative (MLOC) marks two constituents as being in the scope of the (unmarked) "instantiated" verb category, whereas the utilitive case (UTIL) expresses an expected use.

==== Case stacking and concord ====
One of the functions of the modal cases proposed by Heath (2010) is that such internal operation of case stacking may mark the limits of the domain through the repetition of all nouns in the scopal domain of a clause-level inflectional category. The modal cases are used to define the boundaries of clauses.

Case stacking is closely relevant to the concept of concord, which has also been studied in other case-stacking languages such as Lardil and Australian languages in general. The term "concord" is defined as "the morphological realization, on multiple words dominated by a syntactic node n, of a morphosyntactic feature value associated with n."

[_{DP}[_{DP} balarrinabawu	dangkanabawu _{ABL}]	thungalu _{PROP}]
white-‹ABL›-PROP	man-‹ABL›-PROP	thing-PROP
'having a white man's thing' (Round 2012:4.7)

In this example, all three words are dominated by the matrix DP node, and all three bear a proprietive case (PROP). The words within the subordinate DP [balarrinabawu dangkanabawu] ('white man') are dominated by both the matrix and the subordinate node, so both bear the inflectional ablative case (ABL) and proprietive case (PROP). This clearly illustrates the relationship of concord, where the sub-constituents of a syntactic node (i.e., matrix DP, in this example) carry the associating morphosyntactic features.

==== Syntactic structure ====
The height of the syntactic nodes where features and cases attach to within the tree can vary by the relative positions of their domains. When a word carries more than one feature, its relative syntactic height generally corresponds to the linear order of its morphological realization.

=== Lardil ===
Lardil is an Australian language that allows case stacking, and nominals may surface with multiple case affixes. When new morphology is added to a nominal with a semantically uninterpretable case (e.g., accusative), the uninterpretable case is eliminated; however, when a semantically interpretable case is added (e.g., instrumental), the new morphology may be stacked outside the case morpheme. Richards (2013) argues that such uninterpretable cases are first assigned and then dropped.

Ngada derlde marun-ngan-i wangalk-i.
I break boy-GEN-ACC boomerang-ACC
'I broke the boy's boomerang.' (Richards 2012: 20)

From this example, the possessor of the direct object is marked with the genitive suffix ‐ngan first, then with another suffix -i to indicate accusative. It is presumed that the genitive case is assigned by DP internal structures, i.e., the determiner itself; whereas the subsequent cases and features are assigned by higher heads, i.e., the verb, in the above example. This example illustrates the two different sources for the cases involved in stacking, as the genitive case morpheme and the accusative case morpheme are c-commanded and assigned by different constituents.

The order of case is also important in Lardil. In the following example (a), the direct object, wangalkuru [boomerang‐FUT-ACC], bears future case determined by tense concord within its own clause, and then followed by a subsequent accusative suffix determined by case concord with the subject maruni [boy‐ACC]. The affixes are arranged in that order, and the opposite order of affixation would yield an unattested form in (b).

Ngada kangka marun-i were-thuru-Ø wangalk-uru-Ø.
I say boy-ACC throw-FUT-ACC boomerang-FUT-ACC
'I told the boy to throw the boomerang.' (Richards 2012: 21-22)

*wangalk-in-ku(r)
boomerang-ACC-FUT

It is suggested that the affixation order is determined by the order of their assignment. In (a), the future case is assigned by the T of the embedded control clause and the accusative suffix by the case concord with the subject. That results in the order of 'FUT-ACC' in the stacking of cases.

=== Korean ===
Korean exhibits the patterns of case stacking. In general, the language prohibits a nominal from bearing both the nominative and the accusative cases at the same time. However, the nominal can appear in the dative case, the nominative case, or the accusative case or in multiple cases in which one is stacked on top of the other.

철수에게가 돈이 필요하다
Chelswu-eykey-ka ton-i phil-yoha-ta
Chulsoo-DAT-NOM money-NOM need-IN
'Chulsoo needs money." (Gerdts & Youn 2000: 1)(The examples are using the Yale romanization of Korean.)

In this example, the nominative case morpheme -ka is optionally suffixed to the subject (i.e., "Chulsoo") in addition to the dative suffix -eykey. The nature and assignment of -ka in the context of case stacking is an ongoing debate. In addition, the acceptance of case stacking in Korean-speakers may vary upon context. Some speakers may need to consider case stacking in particular contexts to accept it (e.g., spoken context). However, judgment studies also show that Korean speakers judge double accusative ditransitives as unacceptable, but they are not completely avoided in completing sentences. In fact, case stacking is difficult for speakers to accept in most situations unless a particle such as man 'only' or kkaci 'even' intervenes between the dative and nominative case markers such as the following example:

나에게만이 뱀이 무섭다
Na-eykey-man-i paym-i mwusepta
I-DAT-only-NOM snake-NOM fearful
'Only I am afraid of snakes.' (J. Yoon 1996: 110)

Case stacking has been used in various inflectional suffixes in other languages, but it is ungrammatical in Korean to stack the negator before a predicate. That is different from the restrictions on multiple occurrences of the negative prefixes in Korean, which states that a predicate can have only one of these prefixes. That results in the ungrammaticality of forms such as *pul-pul-A, *pi-pi-A, etc. However, the short-form negation an(i) can precede a negative prefix such as pu(l)-, pi-, and mi- but not before another short-form negation of an(i) itself. That results in attested forms such an(i) pul-kanungha- 'impossible', and an(i) pi-kwahakceki- 'unscientific', as well as unattested forms like *an(i) an(i) kanungha-, and *an(i) an(i) kwahakceki-.

=== Sumerian ===
In Sumerian, affixes are arranged in a specific order in the noun phrase and so may not necessarily be directly attached to nouns. The phenomenon is known as double case marking or case displacement.

dumu tur lugal gal~gal kalam.ak.ak.ene.ra
son young king great homeland-GEN-GEN-PL-DAT
'for the young sons of the great kings of the homeland' (Michalowski 2020)

In this example, the genitive NP [kalam] ("homeland") has been assigned multiple markers in reference to the head noun "sons", namely, the genitive marker -ak, the plural -ene, and the dative case -ra. Sumerian nouns may be marked for case, therefore, possessive relationships (e.g., genitive), plurals, and case marking are expressed by suffixed morphemes, which stack onto one another within the noun phrase.

=== Old Georgian ===
A subject in Old Georgian, for instance, would be marked by a subjective affix, as well as a genitive affix:

perx-ni k'ac-isa-ni
foot-NOM.PL man-GEN-NOM.PL
'a man's feet'

In this example, the genitival noun phrase agrees in case (nominative) and number (plural) with the head noun. However, while such a possessive construction is most frequently found in Suffixaufnahme, other nominal constructions may also show similar behavior. In Old Georgian, a postpositional phrase modifying a noun may take on the features of the noun's case and number:

"Ra turpa prinvelia!" c'amoidzaxa ert-ma bavshv-ta-gan-ma
{} {} {} {} one-ERG child-GEN.PL-from-ERG
"'What a wonderful bird!' exclaimed one of the children"

This example has the ergative (also called "narrative") case -ma on ertma repeated in the modifying postpositional phrase, which is headed by -gan.

=== Indo-Aryan ===
A variant of suffixaufnahme exists in several modern Indo-Aryan languages, including Hindustani, Punjabi, Sindhi, Kashmiri and Romani. In these languages, the genitive case suffix or postposition is bound to the dependent noun (usually indicated by the dependent taking the oblique case), but agrees with the head noun in at least one of number or gender as if it was an adjective. The origins of these peculiar genitive case markers lay in their ancestral Prakrit adjectives kera and santaka, which had a pertensive function.

==== Kashmiri ====
Case stacking in Kashmiri occurs mostly with the genitive construction. By adding the suffix -hund or -sund to the noun, its modifier indicates the gender and the number. The genitive takes the case marker of the argument's function and so is marked with the ablative case before a postposition.

kor-en-hɨnd-is mukābal-as=manz
girl[F]-OBJ.PL-GEN.F.PL-OBJ.SG comparison[M]-OBJ.SG=in
'in comparison to the girls' (Verbeke 2017: 11)

In this example, the suffixes -en, -hind, and -is are stacked onto each other after the stem [kor] ("girl") to indicate the respective genitive and ablative cases that are involved.

== Distribution ==
=== Living languages ===
- Awngi (one of the Cushitic languages, which are a primary branch of the Afro-Asiatic languages)
- Basque
- Bats (one of the Nakh languages, which are a primary branch of the Northeast Caucasian languages)
- Chukchi (Chukchi–Kamchatkan languages)
- Dyirbal (one of the Dyirbalic languages, which are a primary branch of the Pama-Nyungan languages)
- Guugu Yalandji, also known as "Gugu-Yalanji", one of the Yalanjic languages, which are a primary branch of the Pama-Nyungan languages
- Kanyara-Mantharta languages (a primary branch of Pama-Nyungan)
  - Kanyara languages, such as the following
    - Thalanyji, also known as "Dhalandji"
  - Mantharta
- Kayardild (one of the Tangkic languages)
- Korean
- Indo-Aryan languages
  - Hindustani
  - Punjabi
  - Sindhi
  - Kashmiri
  - Romani
- Tsakhur (one of the Lezgic languages, a primary branch of Northeast Caucasian)
- Yidiny (a primary branch of Pama-Nyungan)
- Tsez

=== Dead languages ===
- Jiwarli
- Martuthunira
- Mochica

==== Ancient languages ====
- Old Georgian
- Elamite
- Hurrian
- Urartian
- Lycian
- Etruscan
- Lemnian
- Sumerian

== Significance and debates ==
=== Theoretical issues in morphology and syntax ===
Regarding the phenomenon of Suffixaufnahme, Frans Plank (1995) has proposed several theoretical issues in morphology and syntax in his influential work as following:

- Suffixaufnahme represents an oddity in case and agreement that challenges previous theories of both. Such oddity partly originates from parts of speech and inflection patterns that have been influenced by Suffixaufnahme such as case-agreeing words serving as nouns, rather than adjectives, and the genitive case being involved as an inflection, rather than a derivation. Suffixaufnahme also emphasizes case-agreeing inflected nouns more than case-agreeing derived adjectives.
- There are implications on grammatical relations since case agreement have been assumed to encode attribution, apposition or predication.
- Noun phrase constituency and the "depth" or "flatness" of syntax are seen as a core parameter of typological variation, which may be relevant to agglutinative versus flective morphology. The contribution of morphological typology to the linguistic environment can be conducive or hostile to Suffixaufnahme.

=== Nature of case marking ===
==== Case for Korean case stacking ====
One of the studied phenomena is the "nominative" particle -ka being optionally suffixed to the subject in addition to the dative particle -eykey. However, there is an ongoing debate between the cases for and against case stacking. Traditionally, it has been assumed that ka is a case morpheme independent of the inherent dative case and allows noun phrases in the structure. The case of the dative subject itself is claimed to be inherently insufficient to allow its appearance in subject position, therefore, it must receive an additional case in its structure (e.g., the nominative case ka). The nominative case itself can thus also be overtly realized.

That view contradicts the claim that nominative/accusative cases behave genuinely as case markers. Instead, it suggests that case alternations and grammatical subjecthood do not require nominals to exhibit nominative stacking. However, nominative stacked nominals behave like major subjects, and nominative stacking reflect their status as non-nominative major subjects.

==== Case against Korean case stacking ====
Against the traditional approach, one of the hypotheses is made by Carson Schütze (2001) states: "Despite the initial plausibility, stacked case particles are not genuine case-markers. Even unstacked Nominative and Accusative case-markers are ambiguous between marking case and discourse functions like Topic and Focus."

It is proposed that the stacked ka is not a reflection of case. Instead, it should be treated as a focus particle, rather than a case morpheme. Moreover, NP subjects do not require additional morphological nominative case features to be allowed. In fact, the NP that is lexically marked as dative by its predicate is not cannot have even an additional structural case (e.g., nominative or accusative).

This evidence is against the traditional claims proposed by Schütze:

1. Case-stacked sentences require a specific prosody to sound acceptable; e.g., an intonation phrase boundary is required after the subject. If ka were a nominative case marker, additional theories would be needed to account for the prosodic effect.
2. Ka stacking is completely optional. However, when the case particle is present on the object, the nominative case on the subject of a transitive clause becomes obligatory.
3. Stacked and unstacked ka can affect the distribution of subject honorification differently. Nominative subjects must trigger honorific agreement on the predicate, but dative subjects cannot do so. If the stacked ka were a nominative case, it should require honorific agreement, but that is actually disallowed.
4. Ka-stacking is not limited to subjects but occurs also on locative, directional, and temporal adjuncts, etc. However, the structural nominative case is not assignable.
5. Stacked and unstacked ka behave differently with respect to a particular kind of quantifier floating. In Korean, floated numeral quantifiers agree with their head noun in case. If stacked ka reflected morphological nominative case features, then one should allow a nominative quantifier to agree with a stacked ka subject.
6. Stacking can be applied to nominative subjects and not only to the nominative case. The nominative markers can appear on the nominative subject in honorifics.

Evidence of ka as a focus marker

1. Stacking can occur in wh-phrases.
2. Stacking is possible on the answer to a subject wh-question.
3. Stacking can occur in correction contexts.
4. Stacking is compatible with overt focus markers such as 'only' or honorific dative markers.
5. Korean as a multiple-focus language allows a double-focus reading.
6. Ka-stacking is obligatory on the complement to the negated copula anila.
7. With an indefinite dative subject, it is ambiguous between existential and specific readings, but when ka is stacked on the subject, it must be specific.

=== Competing models in case assignment ===
One of the most common models in case assignment is the Agree model, which states that structural case features are assigned to nominals by functional heads. Given a head that can assign case and a nominal that is c-commanded by the head, the case marking associated with the head is assigned to the nominal. Another competing model is the Dependent model, which proposes that the case that a nominal receives is dependent on the presence of other nominals in a local domain. In an ergative language (i.e., downwards), the c-commanding nominal receives dependent case; in an accusative language (i.e., upwards), the c-commanded nominal receives the dependent case. Every nominal that is not assigned a dependent case then bears an unmarked case (i.e., 'nominative' or 'absolutive'). However, within the nominal domain, the unmarked case is represented as the 'genitive' case. In this model, the role of individual functional heads is less direct.

The Dependent model may be applied to Korean case stacking. The direct object is c-commanded by the subject within vP phrase.

Mary-ka John-ul ttayliesse
Mary-NOM John-ACC hit
'Mary hit John.' (Levin 2017: 8)

In this example, neither the direct object John nor the subject Mary receives a lexical case. The direct object John receives the dependent accusative case. However, the subject Mary receives an unmarked nominative case since it is not assigned a dependent case, and its structural position does not satisfy the requirements on the realization of either the lexical or the dependent case.

== See also ==
- Grammar
- Genitive
- Declension
