= Genitive case =

Grammatical case

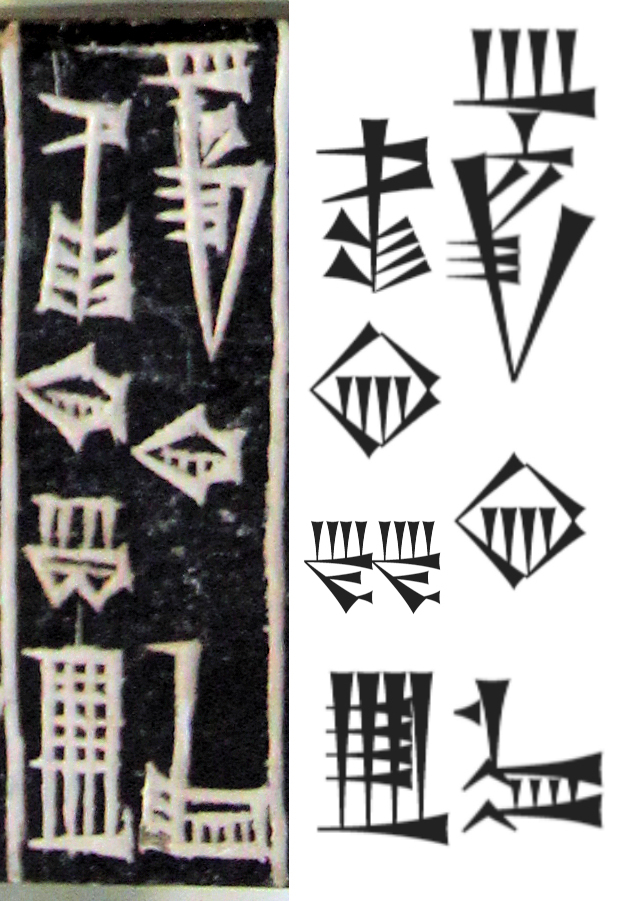
Cuneiform inscription Lugal Kiengi Kiuri 𒈗𒆠𒂗𒄀𒆠𒌵 ("King of Sumer and Akkad") on a seal of Sumerian king Shulgi (r. c. 2094 – c. 2047 BCE) with final ke_{4} 𒆤 being the composite of -k (genitive case) and -e (ergative case)

In grammar, the genitive case (abbreviated gen) is the grammatical case that marks a word, usually a noun, as modifying another word, also usually a noun—thus indicating an attributive relationship of one noun to the other noun. A genitive can also serve purposes indicating other relationships. For example, some verbs may feature arguments in the genitive case; and the genitive case may also have adverbial uses (see adverbial genitive).

The genitive construction includes the genitive case, but is a broader category. Placing a modifying noun in the genitive case is one way of indicating that it is related to a head noun, in a genitive construction. However, there are other ways to indicate a genitive construction. For example, many Afroasiatic languages place the head noun (rather than the modifying noun) in the construct state.

Possessive grammatical constructions, including the possessive case, may be regarded as subsets of the genitive construction. For example, the genitive construction "pack of dogs" is similar, but not identical in meaning to the possessive case "dogs' pack" (and neither of these is entirely interchangeable with "dog pack", which is neither genitive nor possessive). Modern English is an example of a language that has a possessive case rather than a conventional genitive case. That is, Modern English indicates a genitive construction with either the possessive clitic suffix "-'s", or a prepositional genitive construction such as "x of y". However, some irregular English pronouns do have possessive forms which may more commonly be described as genitive (see English possessive). The names of the astronomical constellations have genitive forms which are used in star names, for example the star Mintaka in the constellation Orion (genitive Orionis) is also known as Delta Orionis or 34 Orionis.

Many languages have a genitive case, including Albanian, Arabic, Armenian, Basque, Danish, Dutch, Estonian, Finnish, Georgian, German, Greek, Gothic, Hungarian, Icelandic, Irish, Kannada, Latin, Latvian, Lithuanian, Malayalam, Nepali, Romanian, Sanskrit, Scottish Gaelic, Swedish, Tamil, Telugu, all Slavic languages except Bulgarian and Macedonian, and most of the Turkic languages.

== Functions ==
Depending on the language, specific varieties of genitive-noun–main-noun relationships may include:

- possession (see possessive case, possessed case):
  - inalienable possession ("Janet's height", "Janet's existence", "Janet's long fingers")
  - alienable possession ("Janet's jacket", "Janet's drink")
  - relationship indicated by the noun being modified ("Janet's husband")
- composition (see Partitive):
  - substance ("a wheel of cheese")
  - elements ("a group of men")
  - source ("a portion of the food")
- participation in an action:
  - as an agent ("She benefited from her father's love") – this is called the subjective genitive (Compare "Her father loved her", where Her father is the subject.)
  - as a patient ("the love of music") – this is called the objective genitive (Compare "She loves music", where music is the object.)
- origin ("men of Rome")
- reference ("the capital of the Republic" or "the Republic's capital")
- description ("man of honour", "day of reckoning")
- compounds ("doomsday" ("doom's day"), Scottish Gaelic "ball coise" = "football", where "coise" = gen. of "cas", "foot")
- apposition (the city of Rome)

Depending on the language, some of the relationships mentioned above have their own distinct cases different from the genitive.

Possessive pronouns are distinct pronouns, found in Indo-European languages such as English, that function like pronouns inflected in the genitive. They are considered separate pronouns if contrasting to languages where pronouns are regularly inflected in the genitive. For example, English my is either a separate possessive adjective or an irregular genitive of I, while in Finnish, for example, minun is regularly agglutinated from minu- "I" and -n (genitive).

In some languages, nouns in the genitive case also agree in case with the nouns they modify (that is, it is marked for two cases). This phenomenon is called suffixaufnahme.

In some languages, nouns in the genitive case may be found in inclusio – that is, between the main noun's article and the noun itself.

== English ==
Old English had a genitive case, which has left its mark in modern English in the form of the possessive ending 's (now sometimes referred to as the "Saxon genitive"), as well as possessive adjective forms such as his, their, etc., and in certain words derived from adverbial genitives such as once and afterwards. (Other Old English case markers have generally disappeared completely.) The modern English possessive forms are not normally considered to represent a grammatical case, although they are sometimes referred to as genitives or as belonging to a possessive case. One of the reasons that the status of 's as a case ending is often rejected is that it does not behave as such, but rather as a clitic marking that indicates that a dependency relationship exists between phrases. One can say the King's war, but also the King of France's war, where the genitive marker is attached to the full noun phrase the King of France, whereas case markers are normally attached to the head of a phrase; if the English suffix were attached to the phrase's head, then it would read *the King's of France war.

== Finnic genitives and accusatives ==
Finnic languages (Finnish, Estonian, etc.) have genitive cases.

In Finnish, prototypically the genitive is marked with -n, e.g. maa – maan "country – of the country". The stem may change, however, with consonant gradation and other reasons. For example, in certain words ending in consonants, -e- is added, e.g. mies – miehen "man – of the man", and in some, but not all words ending in -i, the -i is changed to an -e-, to give -en, e.g. lumi – lumen "snow – of the snow". The genitive is used extensively, with animate and inanimate possessors. In addition to the genitive, there is also a partitive case (marked -ta/-tä or -a/-ä) used for expressing that something is a part of a larger mass, e.g. joukko miehiä "a group of men".

In Estonian, the genitive marker -n has elided with respect to Finnish. Thus, the genitive always ends with a vowel, and the singular genitive is sometimes (in a subset of words ending with a vocal in nominative) identical in form to nominative. However, there are multiple strategies to form genitives from nominative forms ending in consonants, including addition of an unpredictable vowel, syncope, or even disfixation.

In Finnish, in addition to the uses mentioned above, there is a construct where the genitive is used to mark a surname. For example, Juhani Virtanen can be also expressed Virtasen Juhani ("Juhani of the Virtanens").

A complication in Finnic languages is that the accusative case -(e)n is homophonic to the genitive case. This case does not indicate possession, but is a syntactic marker for the object, additionally indicating that the action is telic (completed). In Estonian, it is often said that only a "genitive" exists. However, the cases have completely different functions, and the form of the accusative has developed from *-(e)m. (The same sound change has developed into a synchronic mutation of a final m into n in Finnish, e.g. genitive sydämen vs. nominative sydän.) This homophony has exceptions in Finnish, where a separate accusative -(e)t is found in pronouns, e.g. kenet "who (telic object)", vs. kenen "whose".

A difference is also observed in some of the related Sámi languages, where the pronouns and the plural of nouns in the genitive and accusative are easily distinguishable from each other, e.g., kuä'cǩǩmi "eagles' (genitive plural)" and kuä'cǩǩmid "eagles (accusative plural)" in Skolt Sami.

== German ==
The genitive is one of the four cases found in German. It is known as Genitiv, Wessenfall/Wesfall (after the genitive-case interrogative pronoun wessen/wes), and zweiter Fall (lit. "second case", according to the German-language traditional case ordering) .

=== Formation ===
==== Articles ====
The genitive forms of the definite article are des (masculine and neuter singular) and der (feminine singular, all-gender plural). See German articles.

==== Nouns ====
German uses -s/-es for masculine and neutral nouns to label genitive case. For feminine, the noun itself does not change.

- des Beitrags (of the contribution) – masculine
- der Blume (of the flower) – feminine
- des Bundeslandes (of the state) – neuter
- der Bäume (of the trees) – plural

Singular masculine nouns (and one neuter noun) of the weak declension are marked with an -(e)n (or rarely -(e)ns) ending in the genitive case:

- des Raben (of the raven) – masculine
- des Herzens (of the heart) – neuter

==== Adjectives ====
The declension of adjectives in the genitive case is as follows:

	Masculine & Neuter	Feminine & Plural
With article	-en	-en
With no article	-en	-er

==== Personal pronouns ====
The genitive personal pronouns are quite rare and either very formal, literary or outdated. They are as follows (with comparison to the nominative pronouns):

Nominative	Genitive
ich (I)	meiner
du (you sg.)	deiner
er (he)	seiner
es (it)	seiner
wir (we)	unser
ihr (you pl.)	euer
Sie (you formal sg./pl.)	Ihrer
sie (she/they)	ihrer

Some examples:

- Würden Sie statt meiner gehen? (Would you go instead of me?)
- Wir sind ihrer nicht würdig (We are not worthy of her/them)
- Ich werde euer gedenken (I will commemorate you)

==== Relative pronouns ====
Unlike the personal ones, the genitive relative pronouns are in regular use and are as follows (with comparison to the nominative relative pronouns):

	Nominative	Genitive
Masculine	der	dessen
Neuter	das	dessen
Feminine & Plural	die	deren

Some examples:

- Kennst du den Schüler, dessen Mutter eine Hexe ist? (Do you know the student whose mother is a witch?) – masculine
- Sie ist die Frau, deren Mann Rennfahrer ist (She is the woman whose husband is a racer) – feminine

== Greek ==
The ablative case of Indo-European was absorbed into the genitive in Classical Greek. This added to the usages of the "genitive proper", the usages of the "ablatival genitive". The genitive occurs with verbs, adjectives, adverbs and prepositions. See also Genitive absolute.

== Hungarian ==
The Hungarian genitive is constructed using the suffix -é.

- Hungarian: madár ('bird'); madáré ('bird's')

The genitive -é suffix is only used with the predicate of a sentence: it serves the role of mine, yours, hers, etc. The possessed object is left in the nominative case. For example:

- A csőr a madáré ('The beak is the bird's').

If the possessor is not the predicate of the sentence, the genitive is not used. Instead, the possessive suffixes (-(j)e or -(j)a in the third person singular, depending on vowel harmony) mark the possessed object. The possessor is left in the nominative if it directly precedes the possessed object (otherwise it takes a dative -nak/-nek suffix). For example:

- csőr ('beak'); csőre ('its beak')
- a madár csőre/csőre a madárnak ('the bird's beak')

In addition, the suffix -i ('of') is also used. For example:

- madár ('bird'); madári ('avian', 'of bird(s)')

== Japanese ==
Japanese construes the genitive by using the grammatical particle no の. It can be used to show a number of relationships to the head noun. For example:

猫の手 neko-no te ("cat's paw")
学生の一人 gakusei-no hitori ("one of the students")
金の指輪 kin-no yubiwa ("a ring of gold")
京都のどこ Kyouto-no doko ("where of (in) Kyoto")
富士の山 Fuji-no yama ("the mountain of Fuji" [Mt. Fuji])

The archaic genitive case particle -ga ～が is still retained in certain expressions, place names, and dialects. Possessive ga can also be written as a small ke (ヶ), for example in Kasumigaoka (霞ヶ丘).

Typically, languages have nominative case nouns converting into genitive case. It has been found, however, that the Kansai dialect of Japanese will in rare cases allow accusative case to convert to genitive, if specific conditions are met in the clause in which the conversion appears. This is referred to as "Accusative-Genitive conversion."

== Latin ==
The genitive is one of the cases of nouns and pronouns in Latin. Latin genitives still have certain modern scientific uses:

- Scientific names of living things sometimes contain genitives, as in the plant name Buddleja davidii, meaning "David's buddleia". Here davidii is the genitive of Davidius, a Latinized version of the Hebrew name. It is not capitalized because it is the second part of a binomial name.
- Names of astronomical constellations are Latin, and the genitives of their names are used in naming objects in those constellations, as in the Bayer designation of stars. For example, the brightest star in the constellation Virgo is called Alpha Virginis, which is to say "Alpha of Virgo", as virginis is the genitive of virgō. Plural forms and adjectives also decline accordingly: plural Alpha Piscium (Pisces) and Alpha Canum Venaticorum (Canes Venatici) versus singular Alpha Piscis Austrini (Piscis Austrinus) and Alpha Canis Majoris (Canis Major). Astronomy manuals often list the genitive forms, as some are easy to get wrong even with a basic knowledge of Latin, e.g. Vela, which is a neuter plural not a feminine singular: Delta Velorum not *Delta Velae.
- Modus operandi, which can be translated to English as "mode of operation", in which operandi is a singular genitive gerund (i.e. "of operation"), not a plural of operandus as is sometimes mistakenly assumed.

== Irish ==
The Irish language also uses a genitive case (tuiseal ginideach). For example, in the phrase bean an tí (woman of the house), tí is the genitive case of teach, meaning "house". Another example is barr an chnoic, "top of the hill", where cnoc means "hill", but is changed to chnoic, which also incorporates lenition.

== Mandarin ==
In Mandarin Chinese, the genitive case is made by use of the particle 的 (de).

我 的 猫
wǒ de māo
my cat

However, about persons in relation to oneself, 的 is often dropped when the context allows for it to be easily understood.

我 的 妈妈 → 我 妈妈
wǒ de māmā {} wǒ māmā
both mean "my mother"

== Persian ==
Old Persian had a true genitive case inherited from Proto-Indo-European. By the time of Middle Persian, the genitive case had been lost and replaced by an analytical construction which is now called Ezāfe. This construction was inherited by New Persian, and was also later borrowed into numerous other Iranic, Turkic and Indo-Aryan languages of Western and South Asia.

== Semitic languages ==
Genitive case marking existed in Proto-Semitic, Akkadian, and Ugaritic. It indicated possession, and it is preserved today only in Arabic.

=== Akkadian ===
Nominative: šarrum (king)
Genitive: aššat šarrim (wife of king = king's wife)

=== Arabic ===
Called المجرور al-majrūr (meaning "dragged") or المخفوض al-makhfūḍ (meaning "lowered") in Arabic, the genitive case functions both as an indication of ownership (ex. the door of the house) and for nouns following a preposition.

Nominative: ٌبيت baytun (a house)
Genitive: ٍبابُ بيت bābu baytin (door of a house) ِبابُ البيت bābu l-bayti (door of the house)

The Arabic genitive marking also appears after prepositions.

e.g. ٍبابٌ لبيت bābun li-baytin (a door for a house)

The Semitic genitive should not be confused with the pronominal possessive suffixes that exist in all the Semitic languages

e.g. Arabic بيتي bayt-ī (my house) َكتابُك kitābu-ka (your [masc.] book).

== Slavic languages ==
With the exception of Bulgarian and Macedonian, all Slavic languages decline the nouns and adjectives in accordance with the genitive case using a variety of endings depending on the word's lexical category, its gender, number (singular or plural) and in some cases meaning. For instance, in Russian Broutona (lit. Broughton's) island name, its genitive/possessive case is created by adding a affix to the explorer's name.

=== Possessives ===
To indicate possession the ending of the noun indicating the possessor changes depending on the word's ending in the nominative case. For example, to a, u, i, or y in Polish, а, я, ы, or и in Russian, а, я, y, ю, і, и or ей in Ukrainian, and similar cases in other Slavic languages.

Nominative: Polish: "Oto Anton" / Russian: "Вот Антон" / Ukrainian: "Ось Антон" ("Here is Anton").
Genitive: Polish: "Oto obiad Antonа" / Russian: "Вот обед Антона" / Ukrainian: "Ось oбід Антона" ("Here is Anton's lunch").

Possessives can also be formed by the construction: Polish: "u [subject] jest [object]" / Russian: "У [subject] есть [object]"/ Ukrainian: "у(в) [subject] є [object]"

Nominative: Polish: "Oto Anton" / Russian: "Вот Антон" / Ukrainian: "Ось Антон" ("Here is Anton").
Genitive: Polish: "u Antonа jest obiad" / Russian: "У Антона есть обед" / Ukrainian: "У(В) Антона є обід" ("Anton has a lunch", literally: "(There) is a lunch at Anton's").

In sentences where the possessor includes an associated pronoun, the pronoun also changes:

Nominative: Polish: "Oto mój brat" / Russian: "Вот мой брат"/ Ukrainian: "От мій брат" ("Here is my brother").
Genitive: Polish: "u mojego bratа jest obiad" / Russian: "У моего брата есть обед" / Ukrainian: "У мого брата є обід" ("My brother has a lunch", literally: "(There) is a lunch at my_brother's").

And in sentences denoting negative possession, the ending of the object noun also changes:

Nominative: Polish: "Oto Irena/Kornelia" / Russian: "Вот Ирена/Корнелия" / Ukrainian: "От Ірена/Корнелія" ("Here is Irene/Kornelia").
Genitive: Polish: "Irena/Kornelia nie ma obiadu" ("Irene/Kornelia does not have a lunch") or Polish: "u Ireny/Kornelii nie ma obiadu" ("(There) is no lunch at Irene's/Kornelia's")

The Polish phrase "nie ma [object]" can work both as a negation of having [object] or a negation of an existence of [object], but the meaning of the two sentences and its structure is different. (In the first case [subject] is Irene, and in the second case [subject] is virtual, it is "the space" at Irene's place, not Irene herself)

Genitive: Russian: "У Ирены/Корнелии нет обеда" ("Irene/Kornelia does not have a lunch", literally: "(There) is no lunch at Irene's/Kornelia's").

The Russian word "нет" is a contraction of "не" + "есть". In Russian there is no distinction between [subject] not having an [object] and [object] not being present at [subject]'s.

Genitive: Ukrainian: "Ірена/Корнелія не має обіду" ("Irene does not have a lunch") or Ukrainian: "y Ірени/Корнелії нема(є) обіду" ("At Irene's does not have a lunch")

Note the difference between the spelling "не має [object]" and "нема(є) [object]" in both cases.

=== To express negation ===
The genitive case is also used in sentences expressing negation, even when no possessive relationship is involved. The ending of the subject noun changes just as it does in possessive sentences. The genitive, in this sense, can only be used to negate nominative, accusative and genitive sentences, and not other cases.

Nominative: Polish: "(Czy) Maria jest w domu?" / Russian: "Мария дома?" / "(Чи) Марія (є) вдома?" ("Is Maria at home?").
Genitive: Polish: "Marii nie ma w domu" ("Maria is not at home", literally: "[virtual subject] has no Maria at home")
Genitive: Russian: "Марии нет дома" ("Maria is not at home", literally: "Of Maria there is none at home.").
Genitive: Ukrainian: "Марії нема(є) вдома" ("Maria is not at home", literally: "[virtual subject] has no Maria at home.")

Accusative: Polish: "Mogę rozczytać twoje pismo" / Russian: Могу (про)читать твой почерк / Ukrainian: Можу (про)читати твій почерк ("I can read your handwriting")
Genitive: Polish: "Nie mogę rozczytać twojego pisma" / Russian: "Не могу (про)читать твоего почерка" / Ukrainian: "Не можу (про)читати твого почерку" ("I can't read your handwriting")

Use of genitive for negation is obligatory in Slovene, Polish and Old Church Slavonic. Some East Slavic languages ( e.g. Russian and Belarusian) employ either the accusative or genitive for negation, although the genitive is more commonly used. In Czech, Slovak and Serbo-Croatian, negating with the genitive case is perceived as rather archaic and the accusative is preferred, but genitive negation in these languages is still not uncommon, especially in music and literature.

=== Partial direct object ===
The genitive case is used with some verbs and mass nouns to indicate that the action covers only a part of the direct object (having a function of non-existing partitive case), whereas similar constructions using the Accusative case denote full coverage. Compare the sentences:

Genitive: Polish: "Napiłem się wody" / Russian: "Я напился воды" / Ukrainian: "Я напився води" ("I drank water," i.e. "I drank some water, part of the water available")
Accusative: Polish: "Wypiłem wodę" / Russian: "Я выпил воду" / Ukrainian: "Я випив воду" ("I drank the water," i.e. "I drank all the water, all the water in question")

In Russian, special partitive case or sub-case is observed for some uncountable nouns which in some contexts have preferred alternative form on -у/ю instead of standard genitive on -а/я: выпил чаю ('drank some tea'), but сорта чая ('sorts of tea').

=== Prepositional constructions ===
The genitive case is also used in many prepositional constructions. (Usually when some movement or change of state is involved, and when describing the source / destination of the movement. Sometimes also when describing the manner of acting.)

- Czech prepositions using genitive case: od (from), z, ze (from), do (into), bez (without), kromě (excepting), místo (instead of), podle (after, according to), podél (along), okolo (around), u (near, by), vedle (beside), během (during), pomocí (using, by the help of), stran (as regards) etc.
- Polish prepositions using genitive case: od (from), z, ze (from), do, w (into), na (onto), bez (without), zamiast (instead of), wedle (after, according to), wzdłuż (along), około (around), u (near, by), koło (beside), podczas (during), etc.
- Russian prepositions using genitive case: от (from), с, со (from), до (before, up to), без (without), кроме (excepting), вместо (instead of), после (after), вдоль (along), около (around), у (near, by), во время (during), насчёт (regarding), etc.

== Turkish ==
The Turkish genitive, formed with a genitive suffix for the possessor, is used in combination with a possessive for the possessed entity, formed with a possessive suffix. For example, in "my mother's mother", the possessor is "my mother", and the possessed entity is "[her] mother". In Turkish:

Nominative: anne ("mother");
First-person possessive: annem ("my mother");
Third-person possessive: annesi ("[someone]'s mother");
Genitive of annem: annemin ("my mother's");
Genitive and possessive combined: annemin annesi ("my mother's mother", i.e., "my maternal grandmother").

== Albanian ==
The genitive in Albanian is formed with the help of clitics. For example:

Nominative: libër ('book'); vajzë ('girl');
Genitive: libri i vajzës (the girl's book)

If the possessed object is masculine, the clitic is i. If the possessed object is feminine, the clitic is e. If the possessed object is plural, the clitic is e regardless of the gender.

The genitive is used with some prepositions: me anë ('by means of'), nga ana ('on behalf of', 'from the side of'), për arsye ('due to'), për shkak ('because of'), me përjashtim ('with the exception of'), në vend ('instead of').

== Armenian ==
The genitive in Armenian is generally formed by adding "-ի":

Nominative: աղջիկ ('girl'); գիրք ('book');

Genitive: աղջիկի գիրքը ("the girl's book").

However, there are certain words that are not formed this way. For example, words with ուն change to ան:

Nominative: տուն ('house'), Genitive: տան ("house's").

== Dravidian languages ==
=== Kannada ===
In Kannada, the genitive case-endings are:

for masculine or feminine nouns ending in "ಅ" (a): ನ (na)

- Examples: sūrya-na ('of the sun')

for neuter nouns ending in "ಅ" (a): ದ (da)

- Examples: mara-da ('of the tree')

for all nouns ending in "ಇ" (i), "ಈ" (ī), "ಎ" (e), or "ಏ" (ē): ಅ (a)

- Examples: mane-y-a ('of the house'; a linking "y" is added between the stem and the suffix)

for all nouns ending in "ಉ" (u), "ಊ" (ū), "ಋ" (r̥), or "ೠ" (r̥̄): ಇನ (ina)

- Examples; guru-v-ina ('of the teacher'; a linking "v" is added between the stem and the suffix)

Most postpositions in Kannada take the genitive case.

=== Tamil ===
In Tamil, the genitive case ending is the word உடைய or இன், which signifies possession. Depending on the last letter of the noun, the genitive case endings may vary.

If the last letter is a consonant (மெய் எழுத்து), like க், ங், ச், ஞ், ட், ண், த், ந், ப், ம், ய், ர், ல், வ், ழ், then the suffix உடைய/இன் gets added. *Examples: His: அவன் + உடைய = அவனுடைய, Doctor's: மருத்துவர் + உடைய = மருத்துவருடைய, மருத்துவர் + இன் = மருத்துவரின் Kumar's: குமார் + உடைய = குமாருடைய, குமார்+ இன் = குமாரின்

== See also ==
- Genitive construction
- Possessive case
