= Mother of Mine =

Mother of Mine may refer to:

- "Mother o' Mine", a poem by Rudyard Kipling
- "Oh Mother of Mine", a 1961 Miracle label single by Motown singing group The Temptations
- "Mother of Mine" (song), a 1971 song by Neil Reid with many later covers
- Mother of Mine (film), a 2005 Finnish-Swedish film
- Mother O' Mine (1917 film), an American silent drama film
- Mother o' Mine (1921 film), an American silent drama film
- Mother of Mine (TV series), a 2019 South Korean television series

== See also ==
- "That Old Irish Mother of Mine", a 1920 song written by William Jerome
- "Mother of Mine, I Still Have You", 1928 record by Al Jolson
- Example of double genitive
