= Pertensive =

Type of marking in linguistics

In linguistic typology, pertensive marking is to head-marking languages what possessive marking is to dependent-marking languages. The term was coined by the linguist Robert M. W. Dixon in 2011. Pertensive marking can be considered an "inverse genitive" or "inverse possessive."

For example, in English, a dependent-marking language, possession in the phrase "a person's rodent" is indicated by the placement of the possessive suffix "'s" on the dependent grammatical constituent, "person's," and the head constituent, "rodent," is left unmarked. In contrast, Shilluk, a language in South Sudan, places a pertensive affix on the head (e.g., dúup = "rodent", dû́uup = "rodent belonging to").

Other languages with pertensive marking are the Cariban languages (in South America), Nungon (in Papua New Guinea), Hungarian, Mansi, and Khanty (both in Siberia). Some languages, such as Martuthunira (in Australia), have both possessive and pertensive marking.

One of the main uses of the ezāfe in Persian is pertensive marking. Several Afroasiatic languages use a possessive or genitive construction which primarily involves changing the head noun into a special pertensive form called the construct state. Some constructions can also have the dependent noun taking the genitive case. Such double-marking is common in Arabic, where it is referred to as iḍāfah.

Many genitive case postpositions and suffixes in modern Indo-Aryan languages originated as pertensive-esque prepositional adjectives which marked possession. For example, the Hindustani genitive postposition kā descends from the Prakrit adjective kera, and still inflects like an adjective despite no longer being bound to the head noun.
