= Friend of Mine =

Friend(s) of/o' Mine may refer to:

== Music ==
- Friend of Mine (Greg Brown album), 1993
- "Friend of Mine" (Kelly Price song), 1998
- "Friend of Mine" (Rihanna song), 2025
- "Friend of Mine" (The Screaming Jets song), 1995
- "Friend of Mine" (Treble Charger song), 1997
- "Friends of Mine" (The Zombies song), 1967
- Friends of Mine (Adam Green album), 2003
- Friends of Mine (Ramblin' Jack Elliott album), 1998
- "Friend of Mine", a 2006 song by Lily Allen
- "Friend of Mine", a 2025 song by Dean Brody
- "Friends of Mine", a 1981 song included on Duran Duran's eponymous debut album

== Film ==
- A Friend of Mine (2006 film) (Ein Freund von mir), a 2006 German feature film.
- A Friend of Mine (2011 film), a 2011 Estonian film

== See also ==
- "Any Friend of Nicholas Nickleby's is a Friend of Mine" story by Ray Bradbury in the collection I Sing the Body Electric (Bradbury)
- "He Was a Friend of Mine", traditional folk song recorded by Dave Van Ronk, Bob Dylan and many others
- "Just a Friend of Mine", a 1990 song by Vaya Con Dios
- These Friends of Mine, the original title of the American television comedy Ellen
- for "friend of mine" or "friend of ours" in slang of the Mafia, see Made man
- Example of double genitive
