= Absolute construction =

Word or phrase separable from adjacent syntax

In linguistics, an absolute construction is a grammatical construction standing apart from a normal or usual syntactical relation with other words or sentence elements. It can be a non-finite clause that is subordinate in form and modifies an entire sentence, an adjective or possessive pronoun standing alone without a modified substantive, or a transitive verb when its object is implied but not stated. The term absolute derives from Latin absolūtum, meaning "loosened from" or "separated".

Because the non-finite clause, called the absolute clause (or simply the absolute), is not semantically attached to any single element in the sentence, it is easily confused with a dangling participle. The difference is that the participial phrase of a dangling participle is intended to modify a particular noun, but is instead erroneously attached to a different noun, whereas a participial phrase serving as an absolute clause is not intended to modify any noun at all.

== English ==
The absolute construction, or nominative absolute, is not particularly common in modern English and is generally more often seen in writing than in speech, apart from a few fixed expressions such as "weather permitting". Examples include:

- Weather permitting, we will have a barbecue tomorrow.
- All things considered, it's not a bad idea.
- This being the case, let us go.
- The referee having finally arrived, the game began.

== Latin ==
Absolute clauses appear in Classical Latin with the modifying present or past participle in the ablative case; for this reason they are referred to as ablative absolutes. An ablative absolute describes some general circumstance under which the action of a sentence occurs. When translated into English, ablative absolutes are often translated as "with [noun] [participle]":

- Urbe capta Aeneas fugit.
  With the city captured, Aeneas fled.

Absolute clauses also appear with an adjective, although less frequently:

- Omnem enim illam partem regionemque vivo Cn. Pompeio bellum instauraturam esse credebat.
  He believed that region, with Gnaeus Pompeius alive, was going to repeat the war. (De Bello Alexandrino 42)

In Late Latin, absolute clauses also appear in the nominative and accusative cases, even in conjunction with an ablative absolute:

- Benedicens nos episcopus, profecti sumus
  With the bishop blessing us, we departed. (4th century, Peregrinatio Egeriae 16.7)
- Machinis constructis, omniaque genera tormentorum adhibita, ...
  With the machines built, and with all types of torture devices in use... (6th century, Jordanes)

== Other Indo-European languages ==
Absolute constructions occur with other grammatical cases in Indo-European languages, such as accusative absolute in Greek, German and Latin, genitive absolute in Greek, dative absolute in Old English, Gothic and Old Church Slavonic, locative absolute in Sanskrit and instrumental absolute in Anglo-Saxon.

== See also ==
- Ablative absolute – Part of Latin grammar
- Accusative absolute – Grammatical construction
- Disjunct (linguistics) – Word or phrase separable from adjacent syntax
- Genitive absolute – Grammatical construction in Ancient Greek
- Nominative absolute – free-standing part of a sentence that describes the main subject and verb
