= Nominative absolute =

English grammatical structure

In English grammar, a nominative absolute is an absolute (from Latin absolūtum for "loosened from" or "separated") part of a sentence, functioning as a sentence modifier, usually at the beginning or end of the sentence. It provides additional information about the main subject and verb. Its analogues are the ablative absolute in Latin, the genitive absolute in Greek, or the locative absolute in Sanskrit.

A noun in the common case or a pronoun in the nominative case is joined with a predicate that does not include a finite verb.

One way to identify a nominative absolute is to add a conjunction and a verb: one can often (though not always) create a subordinate clause out of a nominative absolute by adding a subordinating conjunction (such as because or when) and a form of the verb to be.

Examples:

Sentences with nominative absolute	Transformed
The dragon slain, the knight took his rest.	Because the dragon was slain, the knight took his rest.
The battle over, the soldiers trudged back to the camp.	When the battle was over, the soldiers trudged back to the camp.
The truck finally loaded, they said goodbye and drove off.	After the truck was finally loaded, they said goodbye and drove off.
We sit side by side, our legs touching, comfortable in the warm silence our two bodies create.	With our legs touching, we sit side by side, comfortable in the warm silence our two bodies create.
Spring advancing, the swallows arrived.	When spring was advancing, the swallows arrived.
