= Ezāfe =

Grammatical particle in Persian

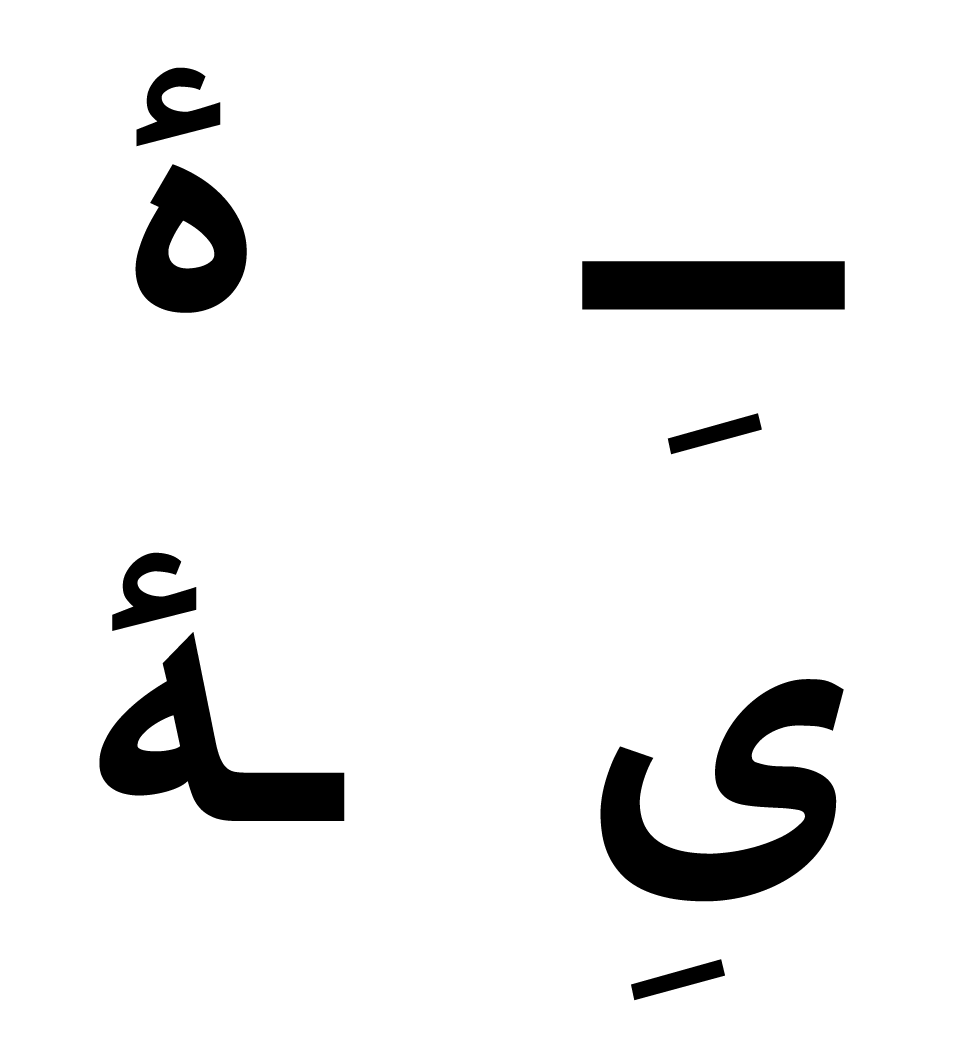
Written forms of ezāfe in the Persian alphabet

The ezāfe (/ˌɛzəˈfeɪ/ EZ-ə-FAY or /ɪˈzɑːfeɪ/ iz-AH-fay; Persian: اضافه [ezɒːˈfe], lit. 'addition') (Note: Also romanized as ezâfe, izafet, izafe, izafat, izāfa, ezafe, and izofa (Tajik: изофа, romanized: izofa). The term is from Arabic إضافة, ʾiḍāfa, referring there to a genitive construction.) is a grammatical particle in Persian, also found in some other Iranian languages, as well as Persian-influenced languages such as Azerbaijani, Turkish, Chagatai, Uzbek, Hindi-Urdu, Punjabi, Bengali and Kashmiri; that links two words together. In the Persian language, it consists of the unstressed short vowel -e or -i (-ye or -yi after vowels) between the words it connects and often approximately corresponds in usage to the English preposition of. It is generally not indicated in writing in the Persian alphabet, which is normally written without short vowels, but it is indicated in Tajik Persian, which is written in a modified Cyrillic script, as -и without a hyphen.

== Ezafe in Persian ==
Common uses of the Persian ezâfe are:

- Possessive (like pertensive marking): برادرِ مریم barādar-e maryam "Maryam's brother" (it can also apply to pronominal possession, برادرِ من barādar-e man "my brother", but in speech it is much more common to shorten it as: برادرم barādar-am).
- Adjective-noun: برادرِ بزرگ barādar-e bozorg "the big brother".
- Given name/title-family name: داریوشِ داریوش‌زاده Dāriuš-e Dāriušzāde, آقایِ داریوش‌زاده āqā-ye Dāriušzāde "Mr. Dariushzadeh"
- Linking two nouns: خیابانِ تهران xiyābān-e Tehrān "Tehran Street"

After final long vowels (ā ا or ū/ō و) in words, the ezâfe is written with the letter ye (ی) intervening before the ezâfe ending. If a word ends in the short vowel (designated by a he ه), the ezâfe may be marked either by placing a hamza diacritic over the he (ـهٔ) or a non-connecting ye after it (ـه‌ی). The ye is prevented from joining by placing a zero-width non-joiner, known in Persian as nim-fāsele (نیم‌فاصله), after the he.

Form	Example in Persian	Example (in Tajik spelling)	Transliteration	Meaning
ـِ	زبانِ پارسی	забони порсӣ	zabān-e pārsī	Persian language
ـِ	جمهوریِ تاجیکستان	Ҷумҳурии Тоҷикистон	jomhuri-ye tājikestān	Republic of Tajikistan
ـِ	دانشگاهِ تهران	Донишгоҳи Теҳрон	dānešgāh-e tehrān	University of Tehran
هٔ	خانهٔ نو	хонаи нав	xāne-ye now	New House
ه‌یِ	خانه‌یِ نو	хонаи нав	xāne-ye now	New House
یِ	دریایِ کاسپین	Дарёи Каспий	daryā-ye Kāspian	Caspian Sea
یِ	پدرِ کوروشِ بزرگ	падари Куруши Бузург	pedar-e kuroš-e bozorg	the father of Cyrus the Great

== In Urdu-Hindi ==
Persian borrowings into the Hindi-Urdu reached a heyday in the 17th century, and grammatical constructs, namely the izafat, were assimilated into Hindi-Urdu.

Iẓāfat, or iẓāfā in Urdu and Hindi is a syntactical construction of two nouns, where the first component is a determined noun, and the second is a determiner. This grammatical construction was entirely borrowed from Persian. In Hindi-Urdu, a short vowel "i" is used to connect these two words, and when pronouncing the newly formed word the short vowel is connected to the first word. If the first word ends in a consonant or an ʿain (ع), it may be written as zer ( ــِـ) at the end of the first word, but usually is not written at all. If the first word ends in choṭī he (ہ) or ye (ی or ے) then hamza (ء) is used above the last letter (ۂ or ئ or ۓ). If the first word ends in a long vowel (ا or و), then a different variation of baṛī yē (ے) with hamza on top (ئے, obtained by adding ے to ئ) is added at the end of the first word. In Devanagari, these characters are written as ए.

Forms		Example	Devanagari	Transliteration	Meaning
Urdu script	Devanagari	Example	Devanagari	Transliteration	Meaning
ـِ	ए	شیرِ پنجاب	शेर-ए-पंजाब	shēr-e-Panjāb	the lion of Punjab
ۂ	ए	ملکۂ دنیا	मलिका-ए-दुनिया	mālika-ye-duniyā	the queen of the world
ئ	ए	ولئ کامل	वली-ए-कामिल	walī-ye-kāmil	perfect saint
ئے	ए	مئے عشق	मय-ए-इश्क़	mai-e-'ishq	the wine of love
ئے	ए	روئے زمین	रू-ए-ज़मीन	rū-ye-zamīn	the surface of the Earth
ئے	ए	صدائے بلند	सदा-ए-बुलन्द	sadā-ye-buland	a high voice

== In other languages ==
Besides Persian, ezâfe is also found in some other Iranian languages and in Persian-influenced Turkic languages, which have historically borrowed many words, phrases, and expressions from Persian. Ottoman Turkish made extensive use of ezâfe, borrowing it from Persian (the official name of the Ottoman Empire was دولتِ عَليۀ عُثمانيه Devlet-i Âliye-i Osmaniyye), and it is transcribed as -i or -ı. Ezâfe is also used frequently in Hindustani, but its use is mostly restricted to Urdu poetic settings or to phrases imported wholesale from Persian since Hindustani by default expresses the genitive with the native declined possessive postposition kā. The title of the Bollywood film, Salaam-e-Ishq, is an example of the use of the Persian ezâfe in Hindustani. Other examples of Persian ezâfe in Hindustani include terms like sazā-e-maut "death penalty" and qābil-e-ta'rīf "praiseworthy". It can also be found in the neo-Bengali language (Bangladeshi, but also especially Dobhashi) constructions especially for titles such as Sher-e-Bangla (Tiger of Bengal), Jamaat-e-Islami (Islamic assembly) and Mah-e-Romzan (Month of Ramadan).

The Albanian language also has an ezâfe-like construction, as for example in Partia e Punës e Shqipërisë, Party of Labour of Albania (the Albanian communist party). The linking particle declines in accordance to the gender, definiteness, and number of the noun that precedes it. It is used in adjectival declension and forming the genitive:

- Zyra e Shefit "The Boss' office" (The office of the boss)
- Në një zyrë të afërt "In an adjacent office"
- Jashtë zyrës së tij "Outside his office" (The office of his)

Besides the above mentioned languages, ezâfe is also used in the Northwestern Iranian Kurdish language:

Çem-ê Dîclê
river-EZAFE‍ Tigris
The Tigris River

== Etymology ==
In Old Persian, nouns had case endings, just like every other early Indo-European language (such as Sanskrit, Latin, Old Greek, Proto-Slavic, and Proto-Germanic). A genitive construction would have looked like a Latin construct, with the first noun being in any case, and the second being in the genitive case.

- vašnā Auramazdāha "by the will of Auramazda"
  vašnā "will" (Instrumental case)
  Auramazdāha "Ahura Mazda (God)" (genitive case)

Over time, a Persian relative pronoun such as tya and hya (meaning "which") began to be interposed between the first element and its genitive attribute.

- by the will which (is) of Auramazdah

William St. Clair Tisdall states that the modern Persian ezâfe stems from the relative pronoun which, which in Eastern Iranian languages (Avestan) was yo or yat. Pahlavi (Middle Persian) shortened it to ī (spelled with the letter Y in Pahlavi scripts), and after noun case endings passed out of usage, this relative pronoun which (pronounced /i/ in New Persian), became a genitive "construct" marker. Thus the phrase

- mard-e xūb مردِ خوب

historically means "man which (is) good" rather than "good man."

In other modern Iranian languages, such as Northern Kurdish, the ezâfe particle is still a relative pronoun, which declines for gender and number. However, rather than translating it as "which," as its etymological origin suggests, a more accurate translation for the Persian use of ezâfe would be a linking genitive/attributive "of" or, in the case of adjectives, not translating it.

Since the ezâfe is not typical of the Avestan language and most Eastern Iranian languages, where the possessives and adjectives normally precede their head noun without a linker, an argument has been put forward that the ezâfe construction may represent a substrate feature of the ancient Elamite influence on Old Persian, which followed the Iranian migration to the territories of the Iranian Plateau previously inhabited by the ancient pre-Iranic Elamites who spoke a language isolate.

== See also ==
- Nominative case
- Oblique case

== Bibliography ==
- Abrahams, Simin (2005). Modern Persian: A Course-Book. London: RoutledgeCurzon. ISBN 0-7007-1327-1.
- Delacy, Richard (2003). Beginner's Urdu Script. McGraw-Hill.
- Haig, Geoffrey (2011). "Linker, relativizer, nominalizer, tense-particle: On the Ezafe in West Iranian". In Foong Ha Yap; Karen Grunow-Hårsta; Janick Wrona (eds.). Nominalization in Asian Languages: Diachronic and typological perspectives. Amsterdam: John Benjamins Publishing Company. pp. 363–390. ISBN 978-90-272-0677-0.
- Harvey, Scott L.; Lehmann, Winfred P.; Slocum, Jonathan (2004). "Old Persian: excerpts from Darian Inscription DB IV". Old Iranian Online. Austin: The University of Texas at Austin.
- Karimi, Yadgar (2007). "Kurdish Ezafe construction: implications for DP structure". Lingua. 117 (12): 2159–2177. doi:10.1016/j.lingua.2007.02.010.
- Moshiri, Leila (1988). Colloquial Persian. London: Routledge. ISBN 0-415-00886-7.
- Tisdall, W. St. Clair (1902). Modern Persian Conversation-Grammar with Reading Lessons, English-Persian Vocabulary and Persian Letters. London: Nutt.
- Yakubovich, Ilya (2020). "Persian ezāfe as a contact-induced feature". Voprosy Jazykoznanija (5): 91–114. doi:10.31857/0373-658X.2020.5.91-114. S2CID 226493392.
