= Adverbial genitive =

Grammatical component

In grammar, an adverbial genitive is a noun declined in the genitive case that functions as an adverb.

== English ==
In Old and Middle English, the genitive case was productive, and adverbial genitives were commonplace. While Modern English does not fully retain the genitive case, it has left various relics, including a number of adverbial genitives. Some of them are now analyzed as ordinary adverbs, including the following:

- always (from all way)
- afterwards, towards, and so on (a superfluous suffix with adverbial -ward)
- once, twice, and thrice (from the roots of one, two, and three)
- whence, thence, and hence (from when, then and obsolete hen ("from now"))

Some words were formed from the adverbial genitive along with an additional epenthetic -t:

- amidst (from amid)
- amongst (from among)
- midst (from mid)
- whilst (from while)

The adverbial genitive also survives in a number of stock phrases; for example, in "I work days and sleep nights", the words days and nights are analyzed as plural nouns but are in fact derived historically from the genitive or instrumental cases of day and night. (That they function as adverbs rather than as direct objects is clear from the rephrasing "I work during the day and sleep at night.") The modern British expression "Of an afternoon I go for a walk" has a similar origin, but uses the periphrasis "of + noun" to replace the original genitive. This periphrastic form has variously been marked as used "particularly in isolated and mountainous regions of the southern United States" and as having "a distinctly literary feel".

== German ==
German uses the genitive as a productive case, in addition to adverbial genitive expressions.

The adverbial suffix -erweise added to adjectives is derived from the feminine singular genitive adjective ending -er agreeing with the noun Weise 'manner'. For example, the adverb glücklicherweise 'fortunately' can be analyzed as glücklicher Weise 'fortunate way [genitive]', i.e. 'in a fortunate way' or more explicitly ‘in a manner of good fortune’ (which also hints at the possessive role of the case).

The conjunction falls ('if') is the genitive of Fall 'case'. Likewise for keinesfalls/keineswegs ('by no means of'), andernfalls ('otherwise' i.e. ‘another way of’).

The preposition angesichts ('in view of') is the genitive of Angesicht ('face').

The time expressions morgens, mittags, abends, nachts, eines Tages (one day) and eines Nachts (one night; analogized with eines Tages, though Nacht is feminine) use the adverbial genitive.

== See also ==
- English grammar
- Genitive case
- History of the English language
- Wiktionary list of adverbial genitives
