= An Introduction to Latin Syntax =

An Introduction to Latin Syntax was a Latin grammar by John Mair published in 1750 in Edinburgh, printed by T. and W. Ruddiman. It saw many subsequent editions, the 8th printed in 1813.

== Appendix ==
Appended to Mair's Introduction proper was Ancient history epitomized, subtitled a short view of the principal transactions and events ... from the creation of the world, to the birth of Christ. Digested chronologically, and adapted to the method of the Introduction to Latin syntax, the English being in one column, and the Latin words in another. ... This text was also reprinted in James Davidson easy and practical introduction to the knowledge of the Latin tongue in 1798.

== Reception ==
Mair's Introduction was cited by John Stuart Mill as evidence for his observation that "The only tolerable Latin grammars for school purposes that I know of, which had been produced in these islands until very lately, were written by Scotchmen" made in his Inaugural Address Delivered to the University of St. Andrews.

== Editions ==
- revised and corrected by R. A. Carson, extended by D. Patterson, New York, 1830 (google books copy)
