= Paraschos =

Paraschos (Greek: Παράσχος) is a Greek male given name and surname which – in its Latinized form – can also be found in the Greek diaspora. It is derived from the ecclesiastical phrase Παράσχου, Κύριε ("Grant this, O Lord"), the first part of which is a conjugated (aorist) form of the Greek verb παρέχω ("to give", "to provide", "to offer").
Notable people with this name include:

- Andreas Paraschos (born 1958), Cypriot journalist
- Georgios Paraschos (born 1952), Greek football manager and former player
