= Infinitive (Ancient Greek) =

Non-finite verb form in Ancient Greek

The Ancient Greek infinitive is a non-finite verb form, sometimes called a verb mood, with no endings for person or number, but it is (unlike in Modern English) inflected for tense and voice (for a general introduction in the grammatical formation and the morphology of the Ancient Greek infinitive see here and for further information see these tables).

It is used mainly to express acts, situations and in general "states of affairs" that are depended on another verb form, usually a finite one.

It is a non declinable nominal verb form equivalent to a noun, and expresses the verbal notion abstractly; used as a noun in its main uses, it has many properties of it, as it will be seen below, yet it differs from it in some respects:

(a) When used with no article, and in its major uses (subject/object), it can normally only be equivalent to either a nominative or an accusative case; used with the article, it may be in any case (nominative, genitive, dative and accusative).
(b) It shows morphological formation according to aspect, voice (active, middle, passive) and tense (only the future infinitive).
(c) It retains some verbal syntactic features: it governs the same oblique case (its object) as the verb to which it belongs, and it may have a subject of its own, in accusative case (See the section accusative and infinitive below).
(d) It is modified by adverbials and not by adjectives.

== Uses ==
Ancient Greek has both (a) the infinitive with the article (articular infinitive), for example τὸ ἀδικεῖν "doing wrong, wrong-doing" and (b) the infinitive without the article, for example ἀδικεῖν "to do wrong".

=== The infinitive with the article ===
The articular infinitive corresponds to a cognate verbal noun (in singular number only). It is preceded by the neuter singular article (τό, τοῦ, τῷ) and has the character and function of both a noun and a verbal form. It can be used in any case (nominative, genitive, dative, accusative) and thus participate in a construction just like any other noun: it can be subject, object (direct or indirect), predicative expression (rarely), or it may also serve as an apposition; it may have an adnominal (e.g. to be in a genitive construction as a possessive or objective genitive etc.) or an adverbial use (e.g. it can form a genitive that denotes cause etc.); it may form an exclamation (in poetry); it can also be the complement (object) of a preposition in any oblique case and denote many adverbial relations; finally, if in the genitive case, it can denote purpose, oftener a negative one.

τὸ παρανομεῖν εἰς κήρυκα καὶ πρέσβεις τοῖς ἄλλοις πᾶσιν ἀσεβὲς εἶναι δοκεῖ. (The articular infinitive τὸ παρανομεῑν is somehow equivalent to the noun ἡ παρανομία "the unlawfulness", and here in nominative case serves as the subject of the verb δοκεῖ "seem, be-considered")
To transgress the laws (= the act of transgressing the laws) against a herald and against ambassadors is considered by all other men to be impious.

τοῦτό ἐστι τὸ ἀδικεῖν (as a predicative nominal in nominative), τὸ πλέον τῶν ἄλλων ζητεῖν ἔχειν. (as a nominative apposition to the demonstrative pronoun τοῦτο)
This is (the definition of) injustice: to seek to have more than other people.

ὁρῶντες πλουσιωτέρους γιγνομένους τοὺς δικαίους τῶν ἀδίκων πολλοὶ καὶ φιλοκερδεῖς ὄντες εὖ μάλα ἐπιμένουσι τῷ μὴ ἀδικεῖν. (as a dative complement of the verb ἐπιμένουσι)
Seeing that the lawful become richer than the unlawful, many, even though they are greedy of gain, very easily persist in not doing unjust acts.

μέγα φρονεῖ ἐπὶ τῷ δύνασθαι λέγειν. (as a dative complement of the preposition ἐπί, denoting cause)
He takes pride in being able to speak (= ...in his ability to speak)

Οὐ νόμῳ μόνον ἐστὶν αἴσχιον τὸ ἀδικεῖν τοῦ ἀδικεῖσθαι [...] ἀλλὰ καὶ φύσει. (τὸ ἀδικεῖν is the subject of the verb ὲστίν and τοῦ ἀδικεῖσθαι serves as a genitive of comparison depended on the comparative degree adjective αἴσχιον)
Wrong-doing is not only by convention more base than suffering it, but also by nature.

ἐτειχίσθη Ἀταλάντη ὑπὸ Ἀθηναίων... τοῦ μὴ ληστὰς κακουργεῖν τὴν Εὔβοιαν. (as a genitive of purpose)
Αtalante was fortified by the Athenians... to prevent pirates from ravaging Euboea.

In all the preceding passages the articular infinitive is in the present tense stem; yet this is by no means a rule, since it can be used in any tense stem, denoting a variety of aspectual differences (For more details see below the discussion about the present and aorist dynamic infinitive).

=== Infinitive without the article ===
The infinitive without the article is of two sorts and has two discrete uses: the dynamic infinitive and the declarative infinitive. Traditionally they are said to be used not in indirect discourse and in indirect discourse respectively, yet this terminology is misleading; for infinitives of both sorts may be used in indirect discourse transformations (for example one may say (a) "I claimed that he will/would undertake an expedition" or (b) "I told/ advised him to undertake/that he should undertake an expedition", where indirect discourse, one way and another, is employed: direct discourse for (a) "He will undertake...", and for (b) "Undertake/you should undertake..."). In ancient Greek both expressions can be constructed upon an infinitival phrase: (a) ἔφην [τοῦτον ἐκστρατεύσεσθαι], direct speech οῠτος ἐκστρατεύσεται (a future declarative infinitive representing a future indicative), (b) ἔφην αὐτῷ [ἐκστρατεύσασθαι], direct speech ἐκστράτευσαι (an aorist dynamic infinitive representing a 2nd person singular imperative); about the presence and/or case of the infinitival subject more are to be said bellow.

==== Dynamic infinitive ====
A so-called dynamic infinitive may be governed by verbs of will or desire to do something (ἐθέλω or βούλομαι "to be willing, wish to", εὔχομαι "pray, wish for", κατεύχομαι "pray against, imprecate curse to", αἱροῦμαι "choose, prefer to", μέλλω "to be about to, or: delay to", κελεύω "urge, command to", ἐπιτάσσω "order to", ψηφίζομαι "vote to", ἐῶ "allow to", δέομαι "beg to" etc.), verbs of will or desire not to do anything (δέδοικα/δέδια "fear to", φοβοῦμαι "be afraid to", ἀπέχομαι "abstain from doing", αἰσχύνομαι "be ashamed to", ἀπαγορεύω "forbid to", κωλύω "hinder, prevent" etc.) and verbs or verbal expressions denoting ability, fitness, necessity, capacity, etc. (δύναμαι, ἔχω "be able to", ἐπίσταμαι, γιγνώσκω "know how to", μανθάνω "learn to", δυνατὸς εἰμί, ἱκανὸς εἰμί "I am able to", δίκαιον ἐστί "it is fair/right to", ἀνάγκη ἐστί "it is necessary to", ὥρα ἐστί "it is time to" etc.). It can also be found after adjectives (and sometimes derived adverbs) of kindred meaning (δεινός "skillful", δυνατός "able", οἷός τε "able", ἱκανός "sufficient, capable" etc.). It stands as the object (direct or indirect) of such verbs or verbal expressions, or it serves as the subject if the verb/the verbal expression is used impersonally; it also defines the meaning of an adjective almost as an accusative of respect. An infinitive of this kind denotes only aspect or stage of action, not actual tense, and can be in any tense stem (mostly in the present and aorist (see also here), the perfect being rare enough) except the future one; only the verb μέλλω "I am about to" may exceptionally take a dynamic future infinitive.

The difference between the present and the aorist infinitive of this sort is aspect or stage of action, not the tense —despite their tense stem, such infinitives always have a future reference, because of the volitive meaning of their governing verb. More specifically, an infinitive in the present verb stem lays stress on "the process or course of the state of affairs", and in many cases has "an immediative" semantic force, while an infinitive in the aorist verb stem lays stress "on the completion of the state of affairs, expressing a well-defined or well-delineated state of affairs".

Present dynamic infinitive (continuing stage of action):

βούλομαί σε εἰς τὰς Ἀθήνας ἰέναι.
I want (for) you to go to Athens (=every time, or=to start/keep going to Athens etc.).

ἀνάγκη ἐστὶ μάχεσθαι.
It is necessary to fight (= to start/keep fighting).

Aorist dynamic infinitive (completed stage of action):

βούλομαί σε εἰς τὰς Ἀθήνας ἐλθεῖν.
I want (for) you to go to Athens. (just once, a simple and sole occurrence of going)

αἰσχύνομαι ὑμῖν εἰπεῖν τἀληθῆ.
I'm ashamed to tell you the truth. (just once, a simple occurrence of telling, as in the previous example)

Analogous aspectual distinctions between the present and aorist verbal stem are present also in the use of finite moods as the imperative and the subjunctive and even the optative of wishes in independent clauses. So, in cases as those presented in the following examples, a dynamic infinitive somehow recalls a corresponding finite mood expressing will or desire, pray or curse, exhortation or prohibition etc. and indirect discourse is from one aspect employed:

τὰς μηχανὰς καὶ ξύλα [...] ἐμπρῆσαι τοὺς ὑπηρέτας ἐκέλευσεν. (aorist dynamic infinitive)
He ordered the servants to set fire to the war engines and timber.
Direct speech form: "Τὰς μηχανὰς καὶ ξύλα ἐμπρήσατε". (2nd plural person, aorist imperative mood) "Set fire to the war engines and timber."

κατηύχετο (τῷ Ἀπόλλωνι) τεῖσαι τοὺς Ἀχαιοὺς τὰ ἃ δάκρυα τοῖς ἐκείνου βέλεσιν. (aorist dynamic infinitive)
He prayed (to Apollo) that the Achaeans should suffer a penalty for his tears by means of his (:the god's) shafts.
Direct speech form: "(Ὦ Ἄπολλον, εἴθε/εἰ γὰρ) τείσειαν οἱ Ἀχαιοὶ τὰ ἐμὰ δάκρυα τοῖς σοῖς βέλεσιν". "Apollo, may the Achaeans suffer a penalty for my tears by means of your shafts". (aorist optative of wish, expressing curse)

==== Declarative infinitive ====
A so-called declarative infinitive (see also declarative sentence) is mostly used in connexion with verbs (or verbal expressions) of saying, thinking and (sometimes) perceiving such as λέγω, φημί, ἀποκρίνομαι, ὑπισχνοῦμαι, ὁμολογῶ, ἀκούω, ὁρῶ etc. and it is usually used in oratio obliqua (in indirect speech or indirect discourse). The latter means that it represents a corresponding finite verb form of the oratio recta (of the direct speech or discourse), thus a declarative infinitive denotes both tense and aspect or stage of action. But the present infinitive represents either a present indicative or an imperfect one, and a perfect infinitive either a perfect indicative or a pluperfect one. A declarative infinitive with the particle ἂν is also the representative of a potential indicative or potential optative of the corresponding tense.

Ὦ ἄνδρες βουλευταί, εἰ μέν τις ὑμῶν νομίζει πλείους τοῦ καιροῦ ἀποθνῄσκειν, ἐννοησάτω ὅτι ὅπου πολιτεῖαι μεθίστανται πανταχοῦ ταῦτα γίγνεται. (Present infinitive = present indicative)
Men of the Senate, if anyone among you thinks that more people than the situation requires are being put to death, let him give consideration to the fact that these things happen wherever any system of government is transformed.
Direct form: Πλείους τοῦ καιροῦ ἀποθνῄσκουσιν "More people are being put to death than the situation requires".

ἔφη σπονδάς σφᾶς ποιήσασθαι [...] καὶ τρέπεσθαι πρὸς τὸν πότον. (Aorist infinitive = aorist indicative; present infinitive = imperfect indicative)
He said that they made drink offerings to the gods and they started betaking themselves to drinking.
Direct form: σπονδάς τε ἐποιησάμεθα [...] καὶ ἐτρεπόμεθα πρὸς τὸν πότον. "We made drink offerings to the gods and we started betaking ourselves to drinking".

ἐγὼ οὖν οἴομαι ἐκεῖνον ἀποθανεῖσθαι. Future infinitive = future indicative
I think that he will die.
Direct form: ἐκεῖνος ἀποθανεῖται "He will die".

ἡγούμην ἀφεθήσεσθαι. Passive Future infinitive = passive future indicative.
I was thinking that I would be released.
Direct form: ἀφεθήσομαι "I will be released".

λέγουσι δέ τινες καὶ ἑκούσιον φαρμάκῳ ἀποθανεῖν αὐτόν. (Aorist infinitive = aorist indicative)
But some people say that he died voluntarily by (drinking) poison.
Direct form: ἑκούσιος φαρμάκῳ ἀπέθανεν "He died voluntarily by (drinking) poison".

...οὓς (anaphoric to τοὺς καλοὺς ἐκείνους καὶ μακροὺς λόγους) ἐν τοῖς μυρίοις ἐν Μεγάλῃ πόλει πρὸς Ἱερώνυμον τὸν ὑπὲρ Φιλίππου λέγοντα ὑπὲρ ὑμῶν ἔφη δεδημηγορηκέναι.
... which (anaphoric to "the fine these long orations") he said he had delivered as your spokesman before the Ten Thousand at Megalopolis in reply to Philip's champion Hieronymus. (the perfect infinitive δεδημηγορηκέναι can represent either a perfect indicative direct speech form δεδημηγόρηκα "I have delivered orations" or a pluperfect one ἐδεδημηγορήκειν "I had delivered orations", the interpretation being left exclusively on contextual or deictic parameters)

ἐγὼ [...] νομίζω αὐτὸν καὶ ἐφ' οἷς νυνὶ ποιεῖ δικαίως ἂν ἀποθανεῖν. Aorist potential infinitive = aorist potential optative.
I think that he would deserve to be put to death even for what he is doing right now.
Direct form: δικαίως ἂν ἀποθάνοι "He would deserve to be put to death".

Verbs that usually have a future reference, such as ὄμνυμι "swear", ὑπισχνοῦμαι "promise", ἐλπίζω "expect, hope", ἀπειλέω "threaten", προσδοκάω "expect" etc., either take the declarative infinitive (mostly the future, but less often some of them also take the present, aorist or perfect infinitive, even the infinitive with the particle ἄν representing a potential optative or indicative), and in this case indirect discourse is employed, or they are followed by the dynamic aorist (less often the present) infinitive, and they are constructed just like any verb of will, desire etc. The same constructional alternation is available in English (declarative content clause -a that clause- or to-infinitive), as shown below.

ὄμνυμι τὰ χρήματα ἀποδώσειν. (future, declarative, infinitive)
I swear that I will give back the money.

ὄμνυμι τὰ χρήματα ἀποδιδόναι. (present, dynamic, infinitive)
I swear to start/keep giving back the money.

ὄμνυμι τὰ χρήματα ἀποδοῦναι. (aorist, dynamic, infinitive)
I swear to give the money back.

For the difference between the present and aorist dynamic infinitive see the discussion in the above section. Yet in the last two examples another reading is also possible, considering ἀποδιδόναι and ἀποδοῦναι to be present and aorist declarative infinitive respectively: "I swear that I give (always, or in any relevant situation etc.) the money back. I swear that I gave the money back."

==== The infinitive in subordinate clauses introduced by conjunctions ====
The ("dynamic") infinitive is used instead of the indicative mood, with substantial difference in meaning, in certain subordinate clauses introduced by specific conjunctions: ὥστε (ὡς) "so as to, so that", πρίν (πρόσθεν... ἤ) "before" or "until" and relative adjectives introducing relative clauses of result, such as ὅσος "so much as enough to", οἷος "of such a sort as to", ὃς or ὅστις "(so...) that he could", in clauses introduced by the prepositional phrases ἐφ' ᾧ or ἐφ' ᾧτε or with ὥστε "with the proviso that".

Note: a "declarative" infinitive is sometimes the mood of subordinated clauses in indirect speech, instead of a corresponding indicative (either a realis or conditional irrealis one) or optative mood, in modal assimilation to the main infinitive used to represent the independent clause of the direct speech; so after relative, temporal or conditional conjunctions such as: ὃς "who" or ὅστις "whoever", ἐπεὶ or ἐπειδή "since, when", ὅτε "when", εἰ "if" etc. An example:

ἔφη δέ, ἐπειδὴ οὗ ἐκβῆναι, τὴν ψυχὴν πορεύεσθαι μετὰ πολλῶν, καὶ ἀφικνεῖσθαι σφᾶς εἰς τόπον τινὰ δαιμόνιον, ἐν ᾧ τῆς τε γῆς δύ' εἶναι χάσματα ἐχομένω ἀλλήλοιν καὶ τοῦ οὐρανοῦ αὖ ἐν τῷ ἄνω ἄλλα καταντικρύ. δικαστὰς δὲ μεταξὺ τούτων καθῆσθαι...
He said that after his soul had departed from his body, it marched accompanied by many others, and they arrived in a marvellous place, where there were two openings side by side in the ground and also two more in the sky in opposite positions. And that judges were seated between these openings...

Here, the main infinitives, those directly depended on the finite verb ἔφη, namely πορεύεσθαι and ἀφικνεῖσθαι, attractivelly affect the mood of the embedded clauses introduced by ἐπειδὴ, a temporal conjunction, and ἐν ᾧ, a relative prepositional phrase.

The corresponding mood form of the direct narration would have been the indicative: ἐπειδὴ ἐμοῦ ἐξέβη, ἡ ψυχὴ ἐπορεύετο μετὰ πολλῶν, καὶ ἀφικνούμεθα εἰς τόπον τινὰ δαιμόνιον, ἐν ᾧ τῆς τε γῆς δύ' ἦσαν χάσματα ἐχομένω ἀλλήλοιν καὶ τοῦ οὐρανοῦ αὖ ἐν τῷ ἄνω ἄλλα καταντικρύ. δικασταὶ δὲ μεταξὺ τούτων ἐκάθηντο...
After my soul had departed from my body, it was marching accompanied by many others, and we were arriving in a marvellous place, where there were two openings side by side in the ground and also two more in the sky in opposite position. And judges were seated between these openings...

==== Subject of the infinitive ====
In general, Greek is a pro drop language or a null-subject language: it does not have to express the (always in nominative case) subject of a finite verb form (either pronoun or noun), unless it is communicatively or syntactically important (e.g. when emphasis and/or contrast is intended etc.). Concerning infinitives, no matter of which type, either articulated or not, and also either of the dynamic or declarative use, the following can be said as a general introduction to the infinitival syntax (:case rules for the infinitival subject):

(1) When the infinitive has a subject of its own (that is, when the subject of the infinitive is not co-referential either with the subject or the object of the governing verb form), then this word stands in the accusative case (Accusative and Infinitive).
(2) When the subject of the infinitive is co-referential with the subject of the main verb, then it is usually neither expressed nor repeated within the infinitival clause (Nominative and Infinitive). Yet, in case of emphasis or contrast, the Accusative and Infinitive must be used.
(3) When the infinitival subject is co-referential either with the object of the main verb or some other argument constructed in a higher syntactic level, eg. a dative of interest with an impersonal verb or verbal expression, then it is usually omitted within the infinitival clause, and any predicate adjective or participle etc. stands in whichsoever case the main verb's argument stands. But it is not unusual at all that an accusative be present or—more usually—understood by a predicate adjective, participle etc. in the accusative.

These three main constructions available are described in some detail in the sections below.

===== Accusative and infinitive =====
The construction where an accusative noun or pronoun functions as the subject of an infinitive is called accusative and infinitive (See also the homonymous Latin construction accusativus cum infinitivo (ACI), which is the rule—in indirect speech—even in cases where verb and infinitive have co-referential subjects). This construction can be used as an indirect speech mechanism, in many instances interchangeable with a complementary declarative clause introduced by "ὅτι/"ὡς" (or a supplementary participle). But with some verbs (normally with verbs of thinking, as νομίζω, οἴομαι, ἡγέομαι, δοκέω etc., with the verb φημί "say, affirm, assert", with verbs denoting hope, oath or promise, such as ἐλπίζω "hope", ὄμνυμι "swear", ὑπισχνοῦμαι "promise", etc.) the infinitival construction is the rule in classical Greek. Yet it can be also in use with any infinitival use, no matter whether indirect speech is involved or not. In the following examples the infinitival clause is put in square brackets []:

λέγουσίν τινες [Σωκράτη σοφὸν εἶναι].
say some-people [Socrates_{ACC} wise_{ACC} be_{INF}] literal translation (Subject and predicate adjective are in accusative case)
Some people say that Socrates is (or: was) wise. idiomatic translation

νομίζουσιν [Σωκράτη σοφὸν εἶναι].
pro_{3rd pl} consider [Socrates _{ACC} wise _{ACC} be _{INF}] literal translation (as stated before)
They consider Socrates to be (or: to have been) wise. idiomatic translation

Oratio Recta/Direct speech for both above examples would have been: Σωκράτης_{NOM} σοφός_{NOM} ἐστιν_{FIN} (or ἦν). "Socrates is (or: was) wise". (Subject and predicate adjective of the finite verb ἐστί in nominative case)

Some actual examples from classic Greek literature:

[τοὺς πονηροτάτους καὶ ἐξαγίστους ὀνομαζομένους τὰς συμφορὰς σωφρονίζειν] λέγουσιν.
[the most-wicked and ungodly called the_{ACC} mishaps_{ACC} chasten_{INF}] pro_{pl 3rd} say-they. literal translation (articulated subject in accusative case; the infinitival object τοὺς ὀνομαζομένους is also in accusative)
People say [that the mishaps chasten those called utterly wicked and ungodly]. idiomatic translation

Oratio recta/Direct speech would have been: τοὺς πονηροτάτους καὶ ἐξαγίστους ὀνομαζομένους αἱ_{NOM} συμφοραὶ_{NOM} σωφρονίζουσιν_{FIN}. "The mishaps chasten those called utterly wicked and ungodly". (Articulated substantive as subject of the finite verb would have been put in nominative case)

νομίζουσιν [τὴν αὑτῶν φύσιν ἱκανωτέραν εἶναι τῆς ὑπὸ τῶν θεῶν προκριθείσης].
pro_{3rd pl} think-they [the_{ACC} their nature_{ACC} more-able_{ACC} be_{INF} than-the by the gods chosen-as-best] literal translation (infinitival subject and predicate in accusative)
They think that their nature is more competent than the one chosen by the gods as best. idiomatic translation

Oratio recta/Direct speech would have been: ἡ_{NOM} ἡμετέρα φύσις_{NOM} ἱκανωτέρα_{NOM} ἐστὶ_{FIN} τῆς ὑπὸ τῶν θεῶν προκριθείσης. "Our nature is more competent than the one chosen by the gods as best". (Articulated substantive -subject of the finite verb- and predicate adjective both in nominative case)

And here is an example where no indirect speech is involved:

ἐβούλοντο οὖν [δοκεῖν αὐτὸν [ἄκοντα καὶ μὴ ἑκόντα μηνύειν]], ὅπως πιστοτέρα ἡ μήνυσις φαίνοιτο.
pro_{3rd pl} wanted-they [seem_{INF} him_{ACC} [unwilling_{ACC} and not willing_{ACC} inform_{INF}], so-that more-credible the revealing-of-information should-appear. literal translation (subject of the first infinitive in accusative, predicates with the second, embedded, infinitive in accusative also)
Their will was that he could seem to be an informer unwillingly, and not willingly, so that the revealing of information should appear more credible. idiomatic translation

This construction, accusative and infinitive, is also always in place when the main verb is an impersonal one or an impersonal verbal expression, and the infinitival clause functions as its subject (here also there is no indirect speech). Of course, in such cases the infinitive has a subject of its own. An example:

[ὑμᾶς _{ACC}] χρὴ [τὴν αὐτὴν γνώμην ἔχοντας _{ACC} τὴν ψῆφον φέρειν].
[You_{ACC}] necessary-is [the same opinion having _{ACC} the vote carry _{INF}] literal translation (Subject of the infinitive ὑμᾶς is in accusative; the participle ἔχοντας shows also concord with this pronominal form)
It is necessary that you vote having the same opinion in mind. idiomatic translation

===== Nominative and infinitive =====
When the subject of the infinitive is identical (coreferential) with the subject of the governing verb, then normally it is omitted and understood in the nominative case. The phenomenon is traditionally understood to be some kind of case attraction (for a modern perspective and relevant modern terminology see also big PRO and little pro and control constructions). In the following examples infinitival clauses are bracketed []; coreferent items are indexed by means of a subscripted "i".

οἱ Συρακόσιοι_{i} ἐνόμιζον [PRO_{i} πολέμῳ οὐκέτι ἂν περιγενέσθαι_{INF}]. (Potential infinitive)
The Syracuseans_{i} were-thinking [PRO_{i} by-war no-more could prevail_{INF}]. (literal translation)
The Syracuseans_{i} believed [that they_{i} couldn't any more prevail in the war]. (idiomatic translation)

Oratio Recta/Direct speech: Πολέμῳ οὐκέτι ἂν περιγενοίμεθα. "We could no more prevail in the war." (Potential optative)

[Πέρσης_{i} _{NOM}] pro_{i} ἔφη [PRO_{i} εἶναι_{INF}].
[Persian_{i} _{NOM}] pro_{i} said-he [PRO_{i} be_{INF}] (literal translation)
He_{i} said (that) he_{i} was (a) Persian_{i}. (idiomatic translation)

Πέρσης is a predicate noun in the nominative, showing case agreement with an understood and omitted pronoun (Here we are dealing with coreferential pro_{i} and PRO_{i}).

Oratio Recta/Direct speech: Πέρσης εἰμί. "I am (a) Persian".

Note: there are certain cases where the subject of the infinitive, whether of the declarative or the dynamic type, is put in accusative case, even though it is co-referent with the subject of the main verb; in this mechanism emphasis or contrast is present. An example:

σχεδόν τι pro_{i} οἶμαι [ἐμὲ_{i ACC} πλείω χρήματα εἰργάσθαι ἢ ἄλλους σύνδυο_{ACC} [οὕστινας βούλει] τῶν σοφιστῶν].
almost in-some-degree pro_{i} think-I [me_{ACC} more money have-earned_{INF} than others_{ACC} two-together_{ACC} [whoever like-you] of-the sopisths]. (literal translation)
I_{i} pretty well think I_{i} have earned more money than any other two sophists together of your choice. (idiomatic translation)

Here the unemphatic dropped null-subject (if emphatic, a 1st person pronoun ἐγώ_{i NOM} should be present) of the main verb is emphatically repeated right after the verb within the infinitival clause in accusative case (ἐμέ, "I"). The meaning is ‘I believe that it is I who have made more money than any other two sophists together – you may choose whoever you like’. The comparative nominal phrase ἢ ἄλλους σύνδυο shows case agreement with ἐμέ.

Oratio recta/Direct speech form: ἐγὼ_{NOM} πλείω χρήματα εἴργασμαι ἢ ἄλλοι σύνδυο_{NOM} [οὕστινας βούλει] τῶν σοφιστῶν. "It is I who have made more money than any other..."

Here now the subject ἐγώ of the finite verb εἴργασμαι (a perfect indicative) is emphatically uttered in nominative case; the second part of the comparison, ἢ ἄλλοι σύνδυο, agrees with this in nominative case.

===== Subject omitted and understood in an oblique case (genitive, dative or accusative) =====
When the infinitival subject is coreferent with a word constructed with the governing verb in a higher syntactic level, in other words, when the subject of the infinitive is itself (a second) argument of the governing verb, then it is normally omitted and understood either in the oblique case in which the second argument is put (see also in the previous paragraph the reference to PRO and control structures), or in the accusative as if in an accusative and infinitive construction (but with the accusative noun or pronoun suppressed and implied).

νῦν σοι_{i} _{DAT} ἔξεστιν, ὦ Ξενοφῶν, [PRO_{i} ἀνδρὶ _{DAT} γενέσθαι].
now for-you_{DAT}, Xenophon, is-possible [PRO_{i} man _{DAT} become _{INF}]. literal translation
Now it is possible for you, Xenophon, [to become a man]. idiomatic translation
(Predicate noun ἀνδρί "a man" in case agreement with the dative σοι "for you".)

Κύρου_{i} _{GEN} ἐδέοντο [PRO_{i} ὡς προθυμοτάτου _{GEN} πρὸς τὸν πόλεμον γενέσθαι].
Cyrus_{I GEN} pro were-begging-they [PRO_{i} as-zeal-as-possible_{GEN} towards the war be_{INF}]. literal translation
They were begging Cyrus_{i} [to be as zeal_{i} as possible in the war]. idiomatic translation
(Predicate adjective προθυμοτάτου "willing" shows case agreement with the genitive object τοῦ Κύρου "Cyrus".)

Πολέμαρχος ὁ Κεφάλου ἐκέλευσε τὸν_{ACC} παῖδα _{i ACC} [PRO_{i} δραμόντα_{ACC} [περιμεῖναί ἑ] κελεῦσαι (ἡμᾶς)]].
Polemarchus the of-Cephalus ordered the_{ACC} lad_{ACC} [running_{ACC} [wait_{INF} for-him] order_{INF} (us)]]. literal translation
Polemarchus the son of Cephalus ordered his lad [to run and bid (us) [wait for him]]. idiomatic translation

In all the above examples the case of the subject of the infinitive is governed by the case requirements of the main verb and "the infinitive is appended as a third argument" (Concerning the second and third examples, in modern linguistic terms we have to do with an object control construction). As fas as the two first are concerned, traditionally this construction is sometimes called (in Latin terminology) dativus cum infinitivo or genitivus cum infinitivo (dative with the infinitive or genitive with the infinitive respectively) and is considered to be a case attraction, the dative or genitive being used instead of a predicate in the accusative: ἄνδρα, ὡς προθυμότατον; see also below.

On the other hand, as it is indicated by predicate adjectives/sunstantives or participial constituents of the infinitival clause, it is not unusual at all for an accusative to be understood and be supplied by context as the subject of the infinitive, as the following examples illustrate. As far as the genitive is concerned, a predicate substantive or a participle normally stands in the accusative while an adjective may stand either in accusative or in genitive case. As far as the dative is concerned, the choice between a word in concord with a dative and an accusative case seems to be laid down by the speaker's/writer's preference.

ἔξεστιν ὑμῖν _{i DAT} [PRO _{i} Λακεδαιμονίοις φίλους _{ACC} γενέσθαι].
For-you_{DAT} is-possible [to-Lacedaemonians friends_{ACC}] become_{INF}]. literal translation
It is possible for you [to become friends to Lacedaemonians]. idiomatic translation
(Predicate adjective φίλους "friends" is in the accusative, in case agreement with an understood and omitted accusative subject ὑμᾶς "you". It might be possible that the accusative is preferred by Thucydides here in order to avoid an accumulation of datives that would produce ambiguity or even incomprehensibility: Λακεδαιμονίοις-υμῖν-φίλοις)

δεόμεθ᾽ οὖν ὑμῶν_{GEN} [ἀκροάσασθαι τῶν λεγομένων, ἐνθυμηθέντας_{ACC} ὅτι...]
are-begging-we then of-you_{GEN} [listen-carefully_{INF} of-what-is-being-said, keeping-in-mind_{ACC} that...] literal translation
We are begging you then [to listen carefully of what is said, keeping in mind that...] idiomatic translation
(Participle ἐνθυμηθέντας "keeping in mind" in the accusative, agreeing in case with an omitted/understood accusative ὑμᾶς "you".)

This construction is obligatory when the infinitive is governed by a participle in any oblique case, more usually an attributive one (and in the nominative also). Here the predicate adjective always shows concord with the case of the leading participle. So an embedded participial clause like φάσκοντες εἶναι σοφοί "claiming that they are wise" or οἱ φάσκοντες εἶναι σοφοί "Those who claim that they are wise" is declined this way -in any of the following word ordering, but in slightly different each time meaning (see topicalization and focusing):

(οἱ) φάσκοντες σοφοὶ _{NOM} εἶναι
(τοὺς) σοφοὺς φάσκοντας _{ACC} εἶναι
(τῶν) φασκόντων _{GEN} εἶναι σοφῶν _{GEN}
(τοῖς) σοφοῖς _{DAT} εἶναι φάσκουσι _{DAT}

In the above phrasal structuring the predicate adjective σοφοὶ "wise" is always put in the case of its governing participle φάσκοντες "claiming".

== Morphology ==
Present infinitives of -ω verbs end with -ειν. The middle and passive voices share the same form and end with -εσθαι. The -ε- contracts if the stem ends with a vowel.

infinitive	present								
infinitive	λῡ́ω	ποιέω	τῑμάω	δηλόω	εἰμί	εἶμι	φημί	δίδωμι	οἶδα
active	λύειν	ποιεῖν	τῑμᾶν	δηλοῦν	εἶναι	ἰέναι	φάναι	διδόναι	εἰδέναι
middle/passive	λύεσθαι	ποιεῖσθαι	τῑμᾶσθαι	δηλοῦσθαι				διδόσθαι	

Note: εἰμί, εἶμι, φημί and οἶδα are not used in the middle or passive voices.

Future active and middle infinitives add -σ- to the future active stem and use the same endings as the present infinitive. Future passive infinitives add -θήσεσθαι to the stem of the aorist passive.

infinitive	future						
infinitive	λῡ́ω	ποιέω	τῑμάω	δηλόω	εἰμί	φημί	δίδωμι
active	λύσειν	ποιήσειν	τῑμήσειν	δηλώσειν		φήσειν	δώσειν
middle	λύσεσθαι	ποιήσεσθαι	τῑμήσεσθαι	δηλώσεσθαι	ἔσεσθαι		δώσεσθαι
passive	λυθήσεσθαι	ποιηθήσεσθαι	τιμηθήσεσθαι	δηλωθήσεσθαι			δωθήσεσθαι

Note: εἰμί is deponent in the future and has middle forms with active meanings ("I will be"). φημί is not used in the middle or passive.

Aorist infinitives of -ω verbs end with -σαι in the active, -σασθαι in the middle and -θηναι in the passive. -μι verbs take -εναι in the active, -σθαι in the middle and -θηναι in the passive. Verbs with 2nd aorist forms (like βάλλω) take -εῖν in the active, but inflect like other aorists in the middle and passive.

infinitive	aorist						
infinitive	λῡ́ω	ποιέω	τῑμάω	δηλόω	φημί	δίδωμι	βάλλω
active	λῦσαι	ποιῆσαι	τῑμῆσαι	δηλῶσαι	φῆσαι	δοῦναι	βαλεῖν
middle	λύεσθαι	ποιείσασθαι	τῑμήσθαι	δηλώσασθαι		δόσθαι	βαλέσθαι
passive	λύθῆναι	ποιηθῆναι	τῑμηθῆναι	δηλωθῆναι		δοθῆναι	βληθῆναι

Perfect active infinitives add -εναι to the reduplicated perfect stem. The middle and passive voices share the same form and add -σθαι.

infinitive	perfect					
infinitive	λῡ́ω	ποιέω	τῑμάω	δηλόω	δίδωμι	
active	λελυκέναι	πεποιηκέναι	τετῑμηκέναι	δεδηλωκέναι	δεδώκεναι	εἰδέναι
middle/passive	λελύσθαι	πεποιῆσθαι	τετῑμῆσθαι	δεδηλῶσθαι	δεδόσθαι	
