= Aorist (Ancient Greek) =

Class of Ancient Greek verbs

In the grammar of Ancient Greek, an aorist (pronounced /ˈeɪ.ərɪst/ AY-ər-ist or /ˈɛərɪst/ AIR-ist; from the Ancient Greek ἀόριστος aóristos, 'undefined') is a type of verb that carries certain information about a grammatical feature called aspect. For example, an English speaker might say either "The tree died" or "The tree was dying", which communicate related but distinct things about the tree and differ in aspect. In ancient Greek, these would be stated, respectively, in the aorist and imperfect. The aorist describes an event as a complete action rather than one that was ongoing, unfolding, repeated, or habitual.

The vast majority of usages of the aorist also describe events or conditions in past time, and traditional grammars like Smyth's A Greek Grammar for Colleges introduce it as one of three secondary tenses expressing past time. However, it is often idiomatic to use the aorist to refer to present time. For example, 'Go to school today' would be expressed using the aorist imperative, since the speaker is giving a command to do an action at one point in time, rather than 'Keep going to school'. Some modern linguists describe the aorist as solely an aspect, claiming that any information about time comes from context.

The aorist is in most cases clearly distinguished by its form. In late prose, it is mandatory for the aorist indicative to have a prefix or lengthened initial syllable called an augment. It often has an infixed s (σ) or th (θ) sound (for active and passive voices, respectively), and it takes a particular set of endings. For example, 'I loosen' is expressed in the present tense as λύω (lúō), while 'I loosened' in the aorist aspect is ἔλυσα (élusa).

== Terminology ==
In the grammatical terminology of classical Greek, the aorist is a tense, one of the seven divisions of the conjugation of a verb, found in all moods and voices. It has a consistent stem across all moods. By contrast, in Theoretical linguistics, tense refers to a form that specifies a point in time (past, present, or future), so in that sense the aorist is a tense-aspect combination.

The literary Greek of Athens in the fifth and fourth centuries BC, Attic Greek, was the standard school-room form of Greek for centuries. This article therefore describes chiefly the Attic aorist but also the variants at other times and in other dialects as needed. The poems of Homer were studied in Athens and may have been compiled there. They are in Epic or Homeric Greek, an artificial blend of several dialects, not including Attic. The Homeric aorist differs in morphology from Attic, but educated Athenians imitated Homeric syntax.

Conversely, Hellenistic or Koine Greek was a blend of several dialects after the conquests of Alexander. Most of the written texts that survive in Koine imitate the Attic taught in schools to a greater or lesser extent, but the spoken language of the writers appears to have simplified and regularized the formation of the aorist, and some of the features of Attic syntax are much less frequently attested.

== Morphology ==
A verb may have either a first aorist or a second aorist: the distinction is like that between weak (punch, punched) and strong verbs (is, was) in English. But the distinction can be better described by considering the second aorist as showing the actual verb stem when the present has a morph to designate present stem, like -σκ-, or reduplication with ι as in δίδωμι. A very few verbs have both types of aorist, sometimes with a distinction of meaning: for example ἵστημι (to set up or cause to stand) has both ἕστησα and ἕστην as aorists, but the first has a transitive meaning ('I set up') and the second an intransitive meaning ('I stood').

=== First ===
The stem of the first aorist is often marked by the addition of morphs: -σα- in the active and middle voice, and -θη- in the passive voice. Because of the σ (sigma), it is also called sigmatic aorist.

==== Compensatory lengthening ====
Compensatory lengthening affects first aorist forms whose verbal root ends in a sonorant (nasal or liquid: ν, μ, ρ, λ).

In Attic and Ionic Greek (also in Doric, with some differences), the σ in the first aorist suffix causes compensatory lengthening of the vowel before the sonorant, producing a long vowel (α → η or ᾱ, ε → ει, ι → ῑ, ο → ου, υ → ῡ).

In Aeolic Greek (which contributes some forms to Homeric), the σ causes compensatory lengthening of the sonorant instead of the vowel, producing a double consonant (ν → νν, λ → λλ).

The present stem sometimes undergoes sound changes caused by a suffix — for instance, -ι̯- (IPA: /j/, English consonantal y). In this case, the aorist is formed from the verbal root without the present-stem sound changes.

present		aorist			meaning
original form	Attic	original form	Attic	Aeolic	meaning
μέν-ω		*μεν-σα	ἔ-μεινα	*ἔ-μεννα	'stay', 'wait for'
*στέλ-ι̯ω	στέλλω	*στελ-σα	ἔ-στειλα	ἔ-στελλα	'prepare', 'send'
*φάν-ι̯ω	φαίνω	*φαν-σα	ἔ-φηνα	*ἔ-φαννα	'show'

Kiparsky analyzes the process as debuccalization of s (σ) to h in Proto-Greek, metathesis of h and the sonorant so that h comes before the sonorant, and assimilation of h to the vowel (Attic-Ionic-Doric) or to the consonant (Aeolic).

- *men-sa → *men-ha (debuccalization) → *mehna (metathesis) → mēna or menna (compensatory lengthening)

==== First aorist endings ====
Most of the active and middle forms of the first aorist contain an α. The indicative forms are similar to the imperfect, and the other moods, except for the subjunctive, are similar to the present, except with an α in the endings instead of an ο or ε. The first person singular indicative active, second person singular imperfect middle, the second person singular imperatives, infinitive active, and masculine nominative singular of the participle (bolded), however, do not follow this pattern. The subjunctive active and middle have endings identical to the present active and mediopassive, while the passive has endings identical to the present active.

Most of the passive forms of the first aorist have endings similar to those of the root aorist.

λύω 'release', aor. λυσ(α)-	indicative	subjunctive	optative	imperative	infinitive	participle
active	ἔλυσ**α** ἔλυσας ἔλυσε ἐλύσαμεν ἐλύσατε ἔλυσαν	λύσω λύσῃς λύσῃ λύσωμεν λύσητε λύσωσι	λύσαιμι λύσαις λύσαι λύσαιμεν λύσαιτε λύσαιεν	— λῦσ**ον** λυσάτω — λύσατε λυσάντων/λυσάτωσαν	λῦσ**αι**	λύσ**ας** λύσασα λῦσαν
middle	ἐλυσάμην ἐλύσ**ω** ἐλύσατο ἐλυσάμεθα ἐλύσασθε ἐλύσαντο	λύσωμαι λύσῃ λύσηται λυσώμεθα λύσησθε λύσωνται	λυσαίμην λύσαιο λύσαιτο λυσαίμεθα λύσαισθε λύσαιντο	— λῦσ**αι** λυσάσθω — λύσασθε λυσάσθων/λυσάσθωσαν	λύσασθαι	λυσάμενος λυσαμένη λυσάμενον
passive	ἐλύθην ἐλύθης ἐλύθη ἐλύθημεν ἐλύθητε ἐλύθησαν	λυθῶ λυθῇς λυθῇ λυθῶμεν λυθῆτε λυθῶσι	λυθείην λυθείης λυθείη λυθείημεν/λυθεῖμεν λυθείητε/λυθεῖτε λυθείησαν/λυθεῖεν	— λύθητι λυθήτω — λύθητε λυθέντων/λυθήτωσαν	λυθῆναι	λυθείς λυθεῖσα λυθέν

=== Second ===
The stem of the second aorist is the bare root of the verb, or a reduplicated version of the root. In these verbs, the present stem often has e-grade of ablaut and adds a nasal infix or suffix to the basic verb root, but the aorist has zero-grade (no e) and no infix or suffix.

==== Zero-grade ====
When the present has a diphthong (e.g., ει), the second aorist has the offglide of the diphthong (ι).

- present λ**ε**ίπω 'leave', aorist λιπ(ο/ε)- (e-grade in present, zero-grade in aorist)

When there is no vowel in the present stem besides the e of ablaut, the aorist has no vowel, or has an α from a vocalic ρ or λ.

- present πέτομαι 'fly', aorist πτ(ο/ε)- (e-grade in present, zero-grade in aorist)
- present τρέπω, aorist τραπ(ο/ε)- (e-grade ρε in present, zero-grade ρ → ρα in aorist)

==== Reduplication ====
Present stems of verbs with a reduplicated aorist often do not have e-grade or an infix or suffix.

- present ἄγω 'lead', aorist ἄγαγ(ο/ε)- (bare stem in present, reduplicated stem in aorist)

==== Second aorist endings ====
The endings include an ο or ε (thematic vowel). In the indicative, endings are identical to those of the imperfect; in non-indicative moods, they are identical to those of the present.

λείπω 'leave', aor. λιπ(ο/ε)-	indicative	subjunctive	optative	imperative	infinitive	participle
active	ἔλιπον ἔλιπες ἔλιπεν ἐλίπομεν ἐλίπετε ἔλιπον	λίπω λίπῃς λίπῃ λίπωμεν λίπητε λίπωσιν	λίποιμι λίποις λίποι λίποιμεν λίποιτε λίποιεν	— λίπε λιπέτω — λίπετε λιπόντων	λιπεῖν	λιπών λιποῦσα λιπόν
middle	ἐλιπόμην ἐλίπου ἐλίπετο ἐλιπόμεθα ἐλίπεσθε ἐλίποντο	λίπωμαι λίπῃ/ει λίπηται λιπώμεθα λίπησθε λίπωνται	λιποίμην λίποιο λίποιτο λιποίμεθα λιποίεσθε λίποιντο	— λιποῦ λιπέσθω — λίπεσθε λιπέσθων	λιπέσθαι	λιπόμενος λιπομένη λιπόμενον
passive	ἐλείφθην ἐλείφθης ἐλείφθη ἐλείφθημεν ἐλείφθητε ἐλείφθησαν	λειφθῶ λειφθῇς λειφθῇ λειφθῶμεν λειφθῆτε λειφθῶσι	λειφθείην λειφθείης λειφθείη λειφθείημεν/λειφθεῖμεν λειφθείητε/λειφθεῖτε λειφθείησαν/λειφθεῖεν	— λείφθητι λειφθήτω — λείφθητε λειφθέντων/λειφθήτωσαν	λειφθῆναι	λειφθείς λειφθεῖσα λειφθέν

==== Second aorist passive ====
A second aorist passive is distinguished from a first aorist passive only by the absence of θ. A few verbs have passive aorists in both forms, usually with no distinction in meaning; but ἐφάνην 'I appeared' is distinguished from ἐφάνθην 'I was shown'.

There is no correlation between the first/second aorist distinction in the active and the passive: a verb with an active second aorist may have a passive first aorist or vice versa.

=== Root ===
The root aorist is characteristic of athematic verbs (those with a present active in -μι). Like the second aorist, the stem is the bare root, and endings are similar to the imperfect in the indicative, and identical to the present in non-indicative moods. It is sometimes included as a subcategory of the second aorist because of these similarities, but unlike the second aorist of thematic verbs, it has no thematic ο/ε.

γιγνώσκω, root aorist stem γνω-, γνο-
	indicative	subjunctive	optative	imperative	infinitive	participle
active	ἔγνων ἔγνως ἔγνω ἔγνωμεν ἔγνωτε ἔγνωσαν	γνῶ γνῷς γνῷ γνῶμεν γνῶτε γνῶσι	γνοίην γνοίης γνοίη γνοῖμεν, γνοίημεν γνοῖτε, γνοίητε γνοῖεν, γνοίησαν	— γνῶθι γνώτω — γνῶτε γνόντων	γνῶναι	γνούς γνοῦσα γνόν

The singular aorist indicative active of some athematic verbs (τίθημι, ἔθηκα; δίδωμι, ἔδωκα; ἵημι, ἧκα) uses a stem formed by the suffix -κα and takes first aorist rather than root aorist endings.

== Syntax ==
The aorist generally presents a situation as an undivided whole, also known as the perfective aspect.

=== Aspectual variations ===
The aorist has a number of variations in meaning that appear in all moods.

==== Ingressive ====
In verbs denoting a state or continuing action, the aorist may express the beginning of the action or the entrance into the state. This is called ingressive aorist (also inceptive or inchoative).

- βασιλεύω 'I am king' (present) — ἐβασίλευσα 'I became king' or 'I ruled' (aorist)
  basileúō — ebasíleusa

==== Resultative ====
The resultative aorist expresses the result of an action. Whether this is truly distinguishable from the normal force of the narrative aorist is disputable.

- ἐβούλευον 'I was deliberating' is imperfect; ἐβούλευσα 'I decided' is aorist.

=== Indicative mood ===
The aorist usually implies a past event in the indicative, but it does not assert pastness, and can be used of present or future events.

- ἀπωλόμην ἄρ᾽, εἴ με δὴ λείψεις, γύναι.
  'I am undone if you will leave me, wife.'

==== Narrative ====
The aorist and the imperfect are the standard tenses for telling a story. The ordinary distinction between them is between an action considered as a single undivided event and the action as a continuous event. Thus, for example, a process as a whole can be described in the imperfect, while the individual steps in that process will be aorist.

- ἔπαιζε ἐν τῇ κώμῃ ταύτῃ ... μετ᾽ ἄλλων ἡλίκων ἐν ὁδῷ. καὶ οἱ παῖδες παίζοντες εἵλοντο ἑωυτῶν βασιλέα εἶναι τοῦτον δὴ .... ὁ δὲ αὐτῶν διέταξε τοὺς μὲν οἰκίας οἰκοδομέειν, τοὺς δὲ δορυφόρους εἶναι, τὸν δέ κου τινὰ αὐτῶν ὀφθαλμὸν βασιλέος εἶναι, τῷ δὲ τινὶ τὰς ἀγγελίας φέρειν ἐδίδου γέρας ....
  '[Cyrus] was playing in this village ... in the road with others of his age. The boys while playing chose to be their king this one .... Then he assigned some of them to the building of houses, some to be his bodyguard, one doubtless to be the King's Eye; to another he gave the right of bringing him messages ....'

Here the imperfect ἔπαιζε 'was playing' is the whole process of the game (which continues past these extracts); the aorists the individual steps.

The narrative aorist has the same force, of an undivided or single action, when used by itself:

- ἐπεὶ δὲ εἶδον αὐτὸν οἵπερ πρόσθεν προσεκύνουν, καὶ τότε προσεκύνησαν, καίπερ εἰδότες ὅτι ἐπὶ θάνατον ἄγοιτο.
  'And when the men who in former days were wont to do him homage saw him, they made their obeisance even then, although they knew that he was being led forth to death.'

'Were wont to do him homage' is the imperfect, 'made their obeisance' the aorist, of προσκυνῶ 'kowtow'.

==== Complexive ====
On the other hand, if the entire action is expressed, not as a continuous action, but as a single undivided event, the aorist is used:

Herodotus introduces his story of Cyrus playing with:

- καὶ ὅτε ἦν δεκαέτης ὁ παῖς, πρῆγμα ἐς αὑτὸν τοιόνδε γενόμενον ἐξέφηνέ μιν·
  'Now when the boy was ten years old, the truth about him was revealed in some such way as this':

The aorist is also used when something is described as happening for some definite interval of time; this particular function can be more precisely called the temporal aorist:

- Οὑμὸς πατὴρ Κέφαλος ἐπείσθη μὲν ὑπὸ Περικλέους εἰς ταύτην γῆν ἀφικέσθαι, ἔτη δὲ τριάκοντα ᾤκησε.
  'My father Cephalus was persuaded by Pericles to come to this land and lived (there) thirty years.'

==== Past-in-the-past ====
The other chief narrative use of the aorist is to express events before the time of the story:

- τούς τε Ἱμεραίους ἔπεισαν ξυμπολεμεῖν καὶ αὐτούς τε ἕπεσθαι καὶ τοῖς ἐκ τῶν νεῶν τῶν σφετέρων ναύταις ὅσοι μὴ εἶχον ὅπλα παρασχεῖν (τὰς γὰρ ναῦς ἀνείλκυσαν ἐν Ἱμέρᾳ)
  'they persuaded the Himeraeans to join in the war, and not only to go with them themselves but to provide arms for the seamen from their vessels (for they had beached their ships at Himera)'

It thus often translates an English or Latin pluperfect: the Greek pluperfect has the narrower function of expressing a state of affairs existing at the time of the story as the result of events before the time of the story.

==== Gnomic ====
The gnomic aorist expresses the way things generally happen, as in proverbs. The empiric aorist states a fact of experience (ἐμπειρίᾱ empeiríā), and is modified by the adverbs meaning 'often', 'always', 'sometimes', 'already', 'not yet', 'never', etc. (English tends to express similar timeless assertions with the simple present.)

The gnomic aorist is regarded as a primary tense in determining the mood of verbs in subordinate clauses. That is to say, subordinate clauses take the subjunctive instead of the optative.

- οἱ τύραννοι πλούσιον ὃν ἄν βούλωνται παραχρῆμ’ ἐποίησαν (not *ἄν βούλοιεν)
  'Tyrants make rich in a moment whomever they wish.'

==== Dramatic ====
In dialogues within tragedy and comedy, the first person singular aorist or present expresses an action performed by the act of speaking, like thanking someone (see performative utterance), or, according to another analysis, a state of mind. This is called tragic or dramatic aorist. The aorist is used when the action is complete in the single statement; the present when the speaker goes on to explain how or why he is acting.

- Ἀλλαντοπώλης. ἥσθην ἀπειλαῖς, ἐγέλασα ψολοκομπίαις,
  ἀπεπυδάρισα μόθωνα, περιεκόκκασα.
  'Sausage-seller. I like your threats, laugh at your empty bluster,
  dance a fling, and cry cuckoo all around.'

=== Indicative mood with particle ===
==== Unattainable wish ====
A wish about the past that cannot be fulfilled is expressed by the aorist indicative with the particles εἴθε eíthe, or εἰ γάρ ei gár, 'if only'. This is called the aorist of unattainable wish.

- εἴθε σοι, ὦ Περίκλεις, τότε συνεγενόμην.
  'If only I had been with you then, Pericles!'

An unattainable wish about the present uses the imperfect. A wish about the future uses the optative with or without a particle; an optative of wish may be unattainable.

==== Past potential ====
The aorist indicative (less commonly the imperfect) with the modal particle ἄν án, Homeric κέ(ν) ké[n], may express past potentiality, probability, or necessity.

- τίς γὰρ ἂν ᾠήθη ταῦτα γενέσθαι;
  'For who would have expected these things to happen?'

==== Iterative ====
The aorist indicative (also the imperfect, or past iterative in Herodotus) with ἄν án may express repeated or customary past action. This is called the iterative indicative. It is similar to the past potential, since it denotes what could have happened at a given point, but unlike the past potential, it is a statement of fact.

- ὁπότε δ’ αὖ γένοιτο κατά τινας τῶν πρόσθεν συμμαχεσαμένων, εἶπεν ἄν

'But whenever he came past any of those who had fought under him before, he would say'

==== Unreal ====
The aorist or imperfect indicative with ἄν án may express past unreality or counterfactuality. This is called the unreal indicative. This construction is used in the consequence of past counterfactual conditional sentences.

=== Participles ===
Outside of indirect discourse, an aorist participle may express any time (past, present, or rarely future) relative to the main verb.

=== Non-indicative moods ===
Outside of the indicative mood, sometimes the aorist determines time (often past time), and sometimes the function of the mood determines it. When the aorist does not determine time, it determines aspect instead.

Aorist in indirect discourse refers to past time relative to the main verb, since it replaces an aorist indicative.

An imperative, subjunctive or optative in an independent clause usually refers to future time, because the imperative express a command, the subjunctive expresses urging, prohibition, or deliberation, and the optative expresses a wish or possibility.

In dependent clauses (temporal, conditional, etc.), the time (past, present, or future) of an aorist subjunctive, optative, or imperative is based on the function of the mood. The subjunctive is used with main verbs in the present and future tenses (primary sequence), and the optative is used with main verbs in the past tenses (secondary sequence) and to express potentiality in the future.

=== Optative mood ===
==== Potential ====
In the potential optative, the aorist expresses aspect, and the potential optative implies future time.

== See also ==
- Aorist
- Perfective aspect

== Bibliography ==
- Rijksbaron, Albert (2002). Syntax and Semantics of the Verb in Classical Greek: An Introduction (3rd ed.). Brill. ISBN 9789050633383. Reprinted 2007 by University of Chicago Press, ISBN 9780226718583.
- Smyth, Herbert Weir (1920) [1916]. A Greek Grammar for Colleges. Cambridge, Massachusetts: American Book Co. – via Perseus.Tufts.edu.
