= Presumptive =

Presumptive may refer to:

- Heir presumptive, a person who is expected to inherit a throne, peerage, or other hereditary honor, but their position can be displaced by the birth of another person with a better claim to the position.
- Presumptive nominee, a person who is candidate for president who has not yet received a party nomination, but is expected to receive that nomination in the near future.
- Presumptive US president, a person who is expected to receive the majority of the Electoral College votes, but the appointed electors in each state have not yet met to cast their votes on the Monday after the second Wednesday in December.
- Speaker-presumptive, a person who is not yet the speaker of a parliament, but is expected to become the speaker in the near future.
- The Presumptive Tax Regime in Pakistan.
- Presumptive mood, a grammatical mood found in some languages.
