= Participle (Ancient Greek) =

Grammatical form

The Ancient Greek participle is a non-finite nominal verb form declined for gender, number and case (thus, it is a verbal adjective) and has many functions in Ancient Greek. It can be active, middle or passive and can be used in the present, future, aorist and perfect tense; these tenses normally represent not absolute time but only time relative to the main verb of the sentence. In general, as it shows no personal endings, its main use is to express an action or situation that accompanies the action or situation expressed by the main verb.

== Terminology ==
The Greek grammarians called a participle a μετοχή 'participation, share', because it shares the properties of a verb and of an adjective. Latin calqued the word as participium, from which English gets participle.

== Uses of the participle ==
Three main syntactic uses of the participle can be distinguished: (a) the participle as a modifier of a noun (attributive participle) (b) the participle used as an obligatory argument of a verb (supplementary participle), (c) the participle as an adverbial satellite of a verbal predicate (circumstantial or adverbial participle).

=== The attributive participle ===
The attributive participle is often, though not always, used with the article (which can be either generic or particular); it functions as a common adjective, it can be in every tense stem, and it is on a par with – and thus often translated as – a relative clause. It shows agreement with a noun, present or implied, in a sentence, and can be assigned any syntactic role an adjective can hold.

ἦν δὲ ὁ τὴν γνώμην ταύτην εἰπὼν Πείσανδρος
The man who spoke this opinion was Pisander.

Like any adjective it can be used substantively (or be nominalized) by omission of an understood noun (easily recoverable from the context):

ὁ βουλόμενος εἰς τὴν πατρίδα ἀπιέναι
Whoever (= any man or soldier who) wants to go home…

ἧκεν ἄγων τὸν μέλλοντα δώσειν τὸ φάρμακον
He came back bringing the (man/one) who was going to give the poison.

Many participles of this sort are equivalent to – and thus translated as – nouns, e.g.:

ὁ φεύγων = the person put on exile, or the person accused, i.e. the exile, or the defendant
τὸ μέλλον = the thing that is going to happen, i.e. the future
ὁ κλέπτων = the person that steals, i.e. the thief

An adverbial notion may be inherent in an attributive participle; the usual notions are those of purpose or consequence (in the future tense), and condition (in all tense stems but the future, with negative particle μή). The following example has a future participle indicating purpose:

νόμον δημοσίᾳ τὸν ταῦτα κωλύσοντα τέθεινται τουτονί.
They have publicly enacted this specific law to prevent these things.

=== The supplementary participle ===
The supplementary participle is always without the article (predicative position of the participle is employed) and can be in any tense stem. This participle has two major uses: (1) in indirect discourse, and (2) not in indirect discourse.

==== The supplementary participle in indirect statements ====
When in this use, the participle corresponds to a particular tense and mood of a simple indicative of any tense, and, if accompanied by the particle ἄν, to potential optative or potential indicative. Verbs taking such a participial clause as an object complement are:

i) Verbs of perceiving, knowing, discovering, remembering and so on such as: ὁράω "see that", ἀκούω "hear that", αἰσθάνομαι "perceive, notice that", γιγνώσκω "come to know, perceive, realize that", ἀγνοέω "not to know", καταλαμβάνω "find (on arrival) that", εὑρίσκω "find that", αἱρέω "catch, detect someone doing something" (passive: ἁλίσκομαι), μανθάνω "learn, know that", οἶδα "know that", σύνοιδα "know (as a witness), or be conscious that", ἐπίσταμαι "understand that", τίθημι "consider that" μέμνημαι "remember that", ἐπιλανθάνομαι "forget that".

ii) Verbs of presentation, i.e. verbs meaning '"announce, show, prove"' such as: ἀγγέλλω "report that", (ἀπο-, ἐπι-) δείκνυμι "show, explain, point out that", ἐλέγχω "prove that".

τίθημί σε ὁμολογοῦντα, ἐπειδὴ οὐκ ἀποκρίνῃ.
I assume that you agree, since you don’t give any reply.

καὶ πρόσθεν μὲν οἶδα αὐτοὺς φοβουμένους χρυσίον ἔχοντας φαίνεσθαι.
And I know too that in the past they were afraid to be seen in possession of gold.

In many of the above cases this participle is interchangeable with a clause introduced by ὅτι or ὡς, for example:

τίς γὰρ οὐκ οἶδεν ὅτι καὶ τὴν χώραν ἡμῶν κατανενέμηνται καὶ τὴν πόλιν κατεσκάφασιν;
For who does not know that they (the Thebans) have portioned out our land for grazing and have razed our city to the ground?

The following case constructions are available for such a supplementary participle:

a. The logical "subject" of the participle and the grammatical subject of the governing verb are coreferential, the participle being put in the nominative case, agreeing with it (we are dealing with a so-called nominative plus participle construction; see also nominative and infinitive):

ὁρῶσιν [ἀδύνατοι ὄντες περιγενέσθαι]
They see [that they are in no position to get the upper hand].
Direct form: ἀδύνατοί ἐσμεν περιγενέσθαι. We are in no position to get the upper hand.

b. The supplementary participle modifies a noun phrase as if it were a "subject" of its own (there is no coreference) and both the participle and this noun are put in the accusative case, just like an accusative and infinitive construction. This is the case where the argument of the verb is not the noun, even though it seems to be a real accusative object, but the verbal notion expressed by the participle itself:

αἰσθάνομαί [τινας παραβαίνοντας τοὺς νόμους].
I understand [that some people break the laws. Independent/direct speech form: "παραβαίνουσί τινες τοὺς νόμους." Some people break the law.
ἀπέδειξε [Λύσανδρον κτείναντα Φιλοκλέα].
He proved [that Lysander killed Philocles]. Independent form: "Λύσανδρος ἔκτεινε Φιλοκλέα." Lysander killed Philocles.

In each of the above sentences, if the participle is taken away, then the remaining construction is ungrammatical, considering that each governing verb retains its initial meaning. This proves that the noun or pronoun is an argument of the participle only, rather than of the verb.

Speaking in modern linguistic terms, this is a case of exceptional case marking (ECM), and verbs allowing that are called raising-to-object ones.

However, with verbs like ὁράω "see", ἀκούω "hear", εὑρίσκω "find", there is another possible construction that does not involve indirect speech, but is a mere description of a sensory input:

οἱ μὲν πρῶτοι εἰσιόντες ἔτι εἴδομεν αὐτὸν κατακείμενον παρὰ τῇ γυναικί, οἱ δ’ ὕστερον ἐν τῇ κλίνῃ γυμνὸν ἑστηκότα.
Those of us who entered first saw him still lying beside my wife, those who came later saw him standing naked on the bed. (Not: We saw [that he was lying].)

ἐγὼ ἡδέως ἀκούω Σωκράτους διαλεγομένου.
I am happy to hear Socrates (when he is) having a discussion. (Not: I hear [that he is discussing].)

In the above sentences αὐτόν and Σωκράτους are second arguments of the verbs εἶδον and ἀκούω respectively, while the participles are added as their third arguments (in modern linguistic terms called (verbal) secondary predicates or small clauses). Here by no means can any ECM phenomenon be attributed. Even further, with such verbs as ἀκούω, which normally take an object in the genitive denoting the source producing a sound, the distinction between the two types of construction is clear. Compare the above example, where Σωκράτους is in the genitive case, with the one below, where Κῦρον is in the accusative case:

ἤκουσε [Κῦρον ἐν Κιλικίᾳ ὄντα].
He heard [that Cyrus was in Cilicia].

==== The supplementary participle not in indirect discourse ====
When this participle is used not in indirect discourse, the following constructions are possible:

i) It is part of a predicate formed out by a copula verb, used mostly as an auxiliary verb; such verbs are: εἰμί “be”, γίγνομαι “become”, rarely ὑπάρχω “happen to be”.

οὐ γὰρ μόνον τὰ σύμφυτα προσεοικότες γίγνονται τοῖς γονεῦσιν οἱ παῖδες ἀλλὰ καὶ τὰ ἐπίκτητα.
The children take after their parents not only as fas as the innate characteristics are concerned but also as the acquired ones.

ii) It forms a predicate with a quasi-copular verb that expresses a way of being, like δῆλός εἰμι, φαίνομαι/φανερός εἰμι "be manifest", λανθάνω "be hidden, unobserved, unseen, unnoticed, unaware", οἴχομαι "be gone, away or absent", τυγχάνω "happen to be", φθάνω "be beforehand with". Semantically, with all these verbs it is the participle itself that expresses the main action, while in many cases the quasi-copular verb qualifies this action almost like an adverbial constituent.

ὁ δ' ἄρα ἐτύγχανεν ὢν εἰς φρόνησιν οὐδὲν βελτίων βατράχου γυρίνου, μὴ ὅτι ἄλλου του ἀνθρώπων.
He was after all in the very moment no better in intellect than a tadpole, to say nothing of being better than any other man.

ὁ Λύσις δῆλος ἦν ἐπιθυμῶν προσελθεῖν.
It was evident that Lysis wanted to come/ Evidently Lysis wanted to come.

All these verbs always have a grammatical subject that is corefential with the logical subject of the participle; only the verbs λανθάνω and φθάνω may have an appended accusative object, as a third argument of the verb, denoting the person from whom someone/something is kept hidden or the person that someone overtakes in the action expressed by the participle.

οὐκ ἂν ἔλαθεν αὐτὸν ὁρμώμενος ὁ Κλέων τῷ στρατῷ.
Cleon could not have departed with his army without being noticed by him.
ὁ δὲ Λύσανδρος ἔφθη τὸν Παυσανίαν ἐν τῷ Ἁλιάρτῳ γενόμενος.
Lysander was beforehand with Pausanias in coming to Aliartus/ Lysander came to Aliartus before Pausanias (did).

NOTE: some of those verbs (such as verbs of presentation: δῆλός εἰμι, φανερός εἰμι, φαίνομαι) may (also) be used as governing verbs in indirect discourse supplemented either by a participle or a clausal construction introduced by the particles ὅτι or ὡς.

iii) It is the complement of verbs denoting commencement, continuation (patience, tolerance) or termination (fatigue) of an action, and it is always in the present tense stem; such verbs are: ὑπάρχω "begin, take the initiative in", ἄρχομαι "start, begin", παύω "cause to cease, stop from", παύομαι "cease, stop", λήγω "leave off, cease", ἀπαγορεύω "give up", κάμνω "be tired or weary", διαβιῶ "spend my whole life", διαμένω, διάγω, διαγίγνομαι, oὐ διαλείπω, διατελῶ "continue, keep up", ἀνέχομαι "tolerate", περιοράω "overlook". With these verbs the participle's logical subject is coreferent with the verb's grammatical subject, if there is no object in the structure, or else with the object, and the participle agrees in case (nominative or accusative/genitive) with this word.

ὡς δ' ἀληθῆ λέγω ἄρξομαι διδάσκων ἐκ τῶν θείων.
And I will begin proving that what I say is the truth, by explaining (Persian) religion.
Ἐγὼ δέομαι ὑμῶν μὴ... τὰ τοιαῦτ' ἀνασχέσθαι τῶν ἐμῶν ἐχθρῶν λεγόντων.
I beg you not to tolerate my personal enemiessaying such things.
ἀνάσχεσθον οὖν ἀγελαστὶ ἀκούοντες αὐτοί τε καὶ οἱ μαθηταὶ ὑμῶν.
So both you and your disciples you must restrain yourselves and listen without laughing (literal translation: please do bear listening without laughing).
ἔπαυσε δὲ τοὺς συμμάχους ὑμῶν ἀφισταμένους.
He stopped the/your allies from revolting/defecting from you.

iv) A supplementary participle can be used with verbs expressing passions of the soul, such as ἀγανακτῶ "be vexed", αἰσχύνομαι "be ashamed", ἥδομαι "be pleased", χαίρω "be happy", λυποῦμαι "be sorry", ὀργίζομαι "get angry".

Σύ τε καλῶς ἐρωτᾷς, ὦ Σώκρατες, καὶ ἐγὼ τοῖς καλῶς ἐρωτῶσι χαίρω ἀποκρινόμενος.
You ask the right questions, Socrates, and I am glad to answer those who ask the right questions.
φρονήσεως δ' ἄρα τις ἐρῶν... ἀγανακτήσει τε ἀποθνῄσκων καὶ οὐχ ἅσμενος εἶσιν αὐτόσε;
And will someone who is in love with wisdom... be ungry about dying and he will not go there gladly?

v) Finally, it is used with some verbs not easy to classify: εὖ/καλῶς/κακῶς/δίκαια/δεινὰ ποιῶ "behave well, honourably, fairly, badly", χαρίζομαι "gratify, favour", ἀδικῶ "do wrong", νικῶ "defeat", περιγίγνομαι "prevail, survive", κρατῶ "have the better of", ἡττῶμαι "be worsted by", λείπομαι "be left behind, fall short".

καλῶς ποιεῖτε τοὺς γέροντας ἐπιμελοῦντες.
You are doing well by taking care of the old men.

=== The circumstantial (adverbial) participle ===
The circumstantial participle, used as a satellite of another verbal form, is always without the article (i.e. it is put in the predicative position). It is added as a modifier to a noun or pronoun to denote the circumstance(s) under which the action of another verbal form (a finite verb or an infinitive/another participle) takes place. The action of the main verb is the main one.

It is also called adverbial because it qualifies the main verb like any other adverb, adverbially used adjective, adverbial prepositional phrase, adverbial clause or supplementary predicate. In most of the cases it has the force of a dependent clause denoting time, cause, purpose, supposition, opposition, concession. Often it denotes manner-means or any other attendant circumstance.

Two main constructions can be distinguished:

i) the participle as a modifier agrees in case (and most of the times in gender and number) with a noun or pronoun that is an argument of the main verb, usually subject, direct or indirect object or dative of interest of any kind. In this case the logical subject of the participle is coreferent to that verbal argument (participium conjuctum). ii) participial phrases, composed by the participle and a quasi-subject noun phrase; such structures form a full new predicate, additional to the verbal predicate: a so-called absolute construction. It is so called because case marking of the whole construction stands "loosened, separated, free" from the verbal (or other) argumentation

Two subtypes can be distinguished:

(1) Genitive absolute: the participle modifies a noun or pronoun (as if its "subject") that stands in the genitive case; in this construction normally the word serving as the logical subject of the participle has no coreference to any other verbal argument, especially the subject. But exceptions are found. (2) Accusative absolute: it is found when the verb in which the participle belongs is impersonal or so used, or when it is an impersonal expression; in this case the subject of the participle is usually an infinitive, as it would be if an impersonal verb in some finite mood was used. This kind of participle is always put in the neuter gender, modifying a neuter noun, as an infinitive really is. Nevertheless, it is also possible for a personal verb's participle to stand with its noun in the accusative absolute construction, if only it is preceded by the particles ὡς or ὥσπερ and expresses cause or conditional comparison respectively.

==== Use of tenses ====
Normally all circumstantial participles, according to the grammatical tense stem used for their morphological formation, express only time relative to that of the main verb, but they always express stage of action. Nevertheless, the future stem is only used for denoting purpose, and seldom for denoting future cause (in the latter case normally the particle ὡς precedes the participle).

==== Kinds of circumstantial participles ====
===== Temporal =====
- The temporal participle is used in the present or in the aorist tense stem (the perfect being fairly rare). It expresses a simultaneous or an anterior action. It is sometimes found with temporal adverbs such as ἅμα "while, simultaneously", ἐνταῦθα "then", ἔπειτα "after", εὐθύς "immediately", ἤδη "already", μεταξύ "meanwhile".

ἀποπλεύσας εἰς Λάμψακον τὰς ναῦς ἐπεσκεύαζεν.
After sailing to Lampsacus he set about repairing the ships.

ἐπαιάνιζον ἅμα πλέοντες.
They were singing the paean while they were sailing.

- The causal participle is used with every tense stem (rarely future when preceded by the particle ὡς).

ὁρῶν αὐτοὺς λυπουμένους ὑπεσχόμην γράψειν τὴν ἐπιστολήν.
As I saw that they were sad I promised to write the letter.

εἰδώς σε ἱκανὸν ὄντα οὐ φοβοῦμαι.
As I know that you are competent, I am not afraid.

===== Causal =====
Some particles may precede a causal participle:

a. ἅτε, οἷον, οἷα, ἅτε δή, οἷον δή, οἷα δή: the reason/cause is presented by the speaker, narrator, or writer as an independent fact (objective reason/cause):

ἅτε δὲ ἀήθους τοῖς Λακεδαιμονίοις γεγενημένης τῆς τοιαύτης συμφορᾶς, πολὺ πένθος ἦν κατὰ τὸ Λακωνικὸν στράτευμα.
As in fact such a calamity had been unusual with the Lacedaemonians, there was great mourning throughout the Laconian army.

b. ὡς: the reason/cause is presented as an idea, thought or personal opinion of the subject of the main verb (subjective cause or reason).

Τὸν Περικλέα ἐν αἰτίᾳ εἶχον ὡς πείσαντα σφᾶς πολεμεῖν.
They found fault with Pericles, on the belief/ground that he had persuaded them to engage in the war.

===== Purpose =====
The final (telic) participle (expresses purpose) is used with the future tense stem. It forms the negation with μή. If the participle is modifying a verb that expresses movement, then it usually stands alone. If the verb does not express a movement then the participle is often found with the particle ὡς (in this case the intention of the subject is underlined as a personal consideration, and in many cases it is difficult to determine whether this participle is final or causal).

ἀνεχώρησεν ἀπαγγελῶν τὰ γεγονότα
He left in order to announce the events.

ψεύδεται ὡς κρύψων τὴν ἀλήθειαν.
He lies in order to hide the truth. (or causal: on the belief that he will hide the truth)

ἔπεμψεν Ἀριστοτέλη ἀγγελοῦντα τὰς σπονδάς.
He sent Aristotle in order for him to announce the agreements (Aristotle will announce).

===== Conditional =====
The conditional participle is used in all tense stems except the future (negated by μή). It stands as the protasis (:hypothesis) of a conditional sentence, the main verb being the apodosis. It can express any type of conditional thought, but is by far more often used along with potential moods or future indicative (and future-like expressions), expressing any kind of future condition.

ὅ νῦν ὑμεῖς μὴ πειθόμενοι ἡμῖν πάθοιτε ἄν (= εἰ μὴ πείθοισθε).
That might well happen to you now if you do not listen to us.

===== Concessive =====
The concessive participle (denotes opposition, concession, or limitation) may be preceded by the particles καὶ, καίπερ, καὶ ταῦτα, οὐδέ, μηδἐ (= although) or/and followed by ὅμως (= nevertheless) in the main verb structure.

Ἀγησίλαος δέ, καίπερ αἰσθανόμενος ταῦτα, ὅμως ἐπέμενε ταῖς σπονδαῖς.
Agesilaus, although he was aware of those things, nevertheless he continued to be steadfast in the truce.

===== Attendant circumstances =====
A participle may also express any other attendant circumstance under which an action takes place:

παραλαβόντες τοὺς Βοιωτοὺς ἐστράτευσαν ἐπὶ Φάρσαλον.
Having taken the Boeotians with them, they marched against Pharsalus.
