= Pentti Aalto =

Finnish linguist (1917–1998)

- Born: 22 July 1917
- Died: 30 November 1998 (aged 81)
- Occupation: Linguist

Pentti Aalto (22 July 1917 – 30 November 1998) was a Finnish linguist who was the University of Helsinki Docent of Comparative Linguistics 1958–1980. Aalto was a student of G. J. Ramstedt. He defended his doctoral dissertation in 1949 in Helsinki.

Aalto published on the Latin gerundive, the Latin gerund, the Greek infinitive, the history of the Finnish study of Oriental, classical, and modern languages. He edited Ramstedt's comparative Altaic grammar and completed an edition of the Mongolian version of the Pan̂carakṣā and a collection of Latin sources of Northeast Asian peoples. He is also the first to translate the ancient Tamil moral text of the Tirukkural into Finnish.

Aalto has mentored several Finnish Indologists, including Asko Parpola. In 1969, his team led by his pupil and successor Parpola, announced its interpretation of the script of the ancient Indus civilization.

== Bibliography ==
- Aalto, Pentti. (1945). Notes on methods of decipherment of unknown writings and languages. Helsinki: Societas Orientalis Fennica.
- Aalto, Pentti. (1953). Studien zur Geschichte des Infinitivs im Griechischen. Helsinki: Annales Academicae Scentiarum Fennicae, vol. 80.2.
- Aalto, Pentti. (1961). Qutuγ-tu Pan̂carakṣā kemekü Tabun Sakiyan neretü Yeke Kölgen sudur, in Umschrift, mit Facsimile der mongolischen Handschrift (Leningr. MSZ. 130) herausgegeben. Wiesbaden: Otto Harrassowitz.
- Aalto, Pentti. (1971). Oriental studies in Finland 1828–1918. Helsinki: Societas Scientiarum Fennica.
- Aalto, Pentti. (1972). Kural—The Ancient Tamil Classic (1st ed.). Helsinki: Societas Orientalis Fennica.
- Aalto, Pentti. (1987). Modern language studies in Finland 1828–1918. Helsinki: Societas Scientiarum Fennica.
- Aalto, Pentti. (1987). Studies in Altaic and comparative philology. Helsinki: The Finnish Oriental Society.
- Aalto, Pentti; & Pekkanen, T. (1975–1980). Latin sources on north-eastern Eurasia (2 Vols). Wiesbaden: Otto Harrassowitz.
- Halén, H. (1977). "Bibliography of Professor Pentti Aalto's publications 1938–1976". Studia Orientalia. 47: 287–311.
- Halén, H. (1987). "Bibliography of Professor Pentti Aalto's publications from 1977 to 1987, with additions to the previous list". Studia Orientalia. 59: 260–265.
- Ramstedt, G. J. (1952–1966). Einführung in die altaische Sprachwissenschaft, bearbeitet und herausgegeben von P. Aalto (3 Vols). Helsinki: Suomalais-Ugrilainen Seura.

== Bibliography ==
- Parpola, A. (2005). "Aalto, Pentti (1917-1998)". In Brown, Keith (ed.). Encyclopedia of Language and Linguistics. Elsevier Science. p. 3. ISBN 978-0-08-044299-0.
- "Aalto Pentti". Persons of Indian Studies by Prof. Dr. Klaus Karttunen. 25 January 2017.
