= Ancient Greek grammar =

Grammar of the Ancient Greek language

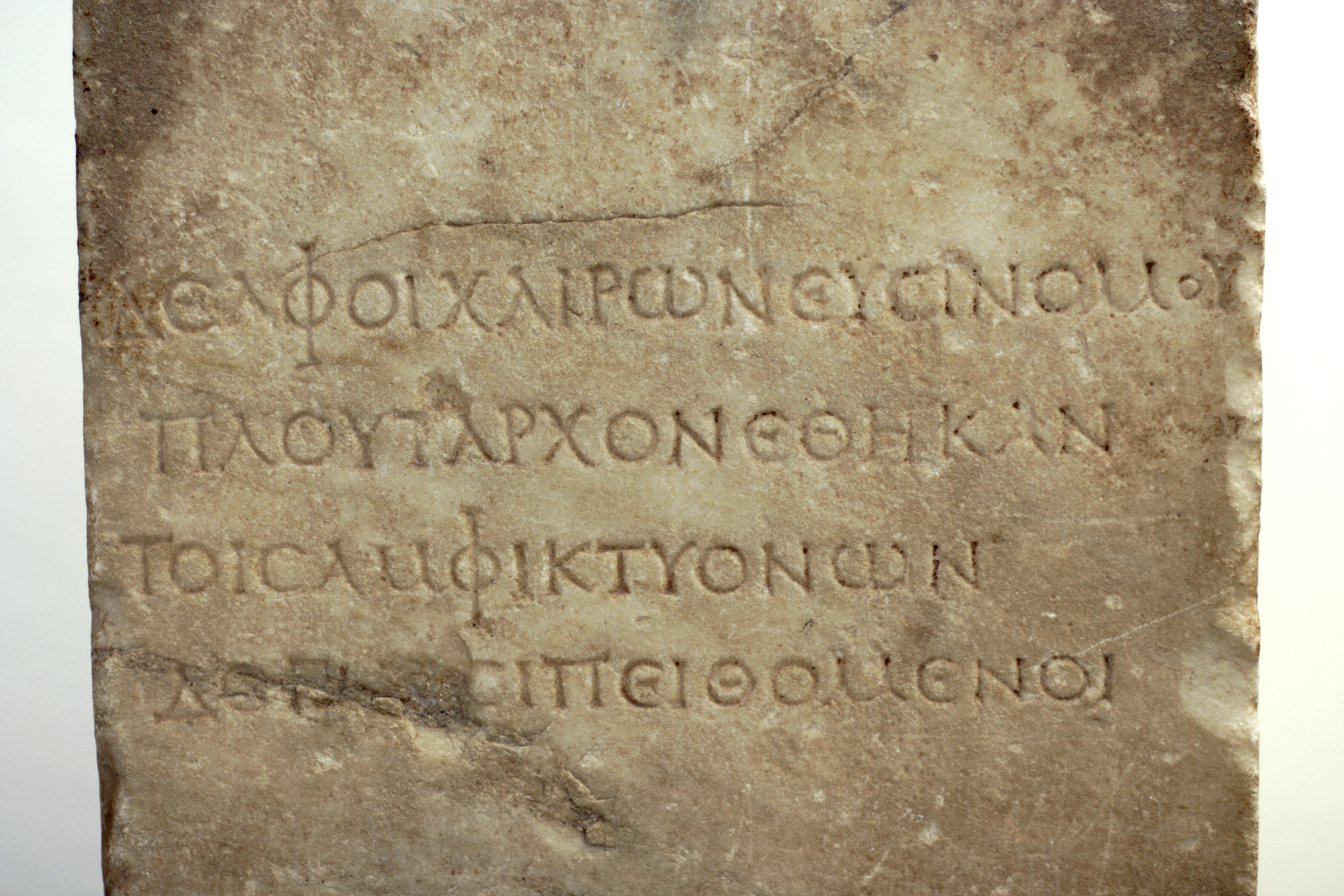
Stela of Plutarch

Ancient Greek grammar is morphologically complex and preserves several features of Proto-Indo-European morphology. Nouns, adjectives, pronouns, articles, numerals and especially verbs are all highly inflected.

A complication of Greek grammar is that different Greek authors wrote in different dialects, all of which have slightly different grammatical forms (see Ancient Greek dialects). For example, the history of Herodotus and medical works of Hippocrates are written in Ionic, the poems of Sappho in Aeolic, and the odes of Pindar in Doric; the poems of Homer are written in a mixed dialect, mostly Ionic, with many archaic and poetic forms. The grammar of Koine Greek (the Greek lingua franca spoken in the Hellenistic and later periods) also differs slightly from classical Greek. This article primarily discusses the morphology and syntax of Attic Greek, that is the Greek spoken at Athens in the century from 430 BC to 330 BC, as exemplified in the historical works of Thucydides and Xenophon, the comedies of Aristophanes, the philosophical dialogues of Plato, and the speeches of Lysias and Demosthenes.

== Writing system ==
=== Alphabet ===
Ancient Greek is written in its own alphabet, which is derived from the Phoenician alphabet. There are 24 letters, namely:

Α	Β	Γ	Δ	Ε	Ζ	Η	Θ	Ι	Κ	Λ	Μ	Ν	Ξ	Ο	Π	Ρ	Σ	Τ	Υ	Φ	Χ	Ψ	Ω
α	β	γ	δ	ε	ζ	η	θ	ι	κ	λ	μ	ν	ξ	ο	π	ρ	σ(ς)	τ	υ	φ	χ	ψ	ω
a	b	g	d	e	z	ē	th	i	k	l	m	n	x	o	p	r	s	t	u	ph	kh	ps	ō

Inscriptions show that in the classical period Greek was written entirely in capital letters, with no spaces between the words. The use of the lower-case cursive letters developed gradually.

Two punctuation marks are used in Greek texts which are not found in English: the colon, which consists of a dot raised above the line ( · ) and the Greek question mark, which looks like the English semicolon ( ; ).

Another feature of Greek writing in books printed today is that when there is a long diphthong ending in /i/, as in ᾳ, ῃ, ῳ (āi, ēi, ōi) /aːi̯ ɛːi̯ ɔːi̯/, the iota is written under the long vowel, as in τύχῃ (túkhēi) "by chance". This is known as iota subscript. When the main letter is capitalized, the iota can be written alongside instead, as in Ἅιδης (Háidēs) "Hades"; this is known as iota adscript.

It is a convention in Ancient Greek texts that a capital letter is not written at the beginning of a sentence (except in some texts to indicate the beginning of direct speech). However, capital letters are used for the initial letter of names. Where a name starts with a rough breathing, as in Ἑρμῆς (Hermês) "Hermes", it is the initial vowel, not the breathing, which is made capital.

Another convention of writing Greek is that the sound ng [ŋ] in the consonant clusters /ng/, /nk/ and /nkʰ/ is written with a gamma: γγ, γκ, γχ (ng, nk, nkh), as in ἄγγελος (ángelos) "messenger", ἀνάγκη (anánkē) "necessity", τυγχάνει (tunkhánei) "it happens (to be)".

The lower-case letter Σ (S) ("sigma") is written ς (s) at the end of a word, otherwise σ (s), e.g. σοφός (sophós) "wise", ἐσμέν (esmén) "we are".

=== Diacritics ===
==== Breathings ====
- The rough breathing ( ῾ ; known as δασὺ πνεῦμα (dasù pneûma) or δασεῖα (daseîa) in Greek, spiritus asper in Latin), written over a vowel letter, marks the sound /h/ at the beginning of a word, before the vowel. Written over the letter ρ (r), it indicates that the r sound is voiceless: [r̥]. At the beginning of a word, the letters υ and ρ always have the rough breathing.
- The smooth breathing ( ᾿ ; known as ψῑλὸν πνεῦμα (psilòn pneûma) or ψῑλή (psilē) in Greek, spīritus lēnis in Latin) marks the absence of the /h/ sound. It is used on any word which starts with a vowel, e.g. ἐγώ (egṓ) "I".

When a word starts with a diphthong, e.g. εὑρίσκω (heurískō) "I find", the breathing goes on the second of the two vowels.

A sign similar to a smooth breathing, called a coronis, is used to show when two words have joined together by a process called crasis ("mixing"), e.g. κᾱ̓γώ (kāgṓ) "I too", contracted from καὶ ἐγώ (kaì egṓ).

==== Accents ====
Written accents, marking the tonic syllables of Greek words, appear to have been invented in the 3rd century BC, but only became commonly used in the 2nd century AD.

- The acute accent ( ´ ; known as ὀξεῖα (oxeîa) in Greek) is used on long or short vowels on any of the last three syllables of a word. However, if the last vowel of the word is long (with certain exceptions), the acute cannot go further from the end than the penultimate syllable. Compare ἄνθρωπος (ánthrōpos) "man" vs. ἀνθρώπου (anthrṓpou) "of a man". It is usually accepted that in classical Greek the accent was a pitch accent, that is, the accented syllable was pronounced on a higher pitch than the other syllables of the word. The accent is believed to have changed to a stress accent by about the 2nd century AD.
- The grave accent ( ` ; known as βαρεῖα (bareîa, bare in Greek)) is used on long or short vowels and usually replaces an acute accent on the final syllable of a word when the word is used non-finally in a sentence. So the word καλός (kalós) "beautiful" changes to καλὸς (kalòs) in the phrase καλὸς καὶ ἀγαθός (kalòs kaì agathós) "beautiful and good". However, the acute remains when a punctuation mark follows, e.g. αὐτῷ εἰπέ, ὦ Νῑκίᾱ (autôi eipé, ô Nīkíā) "tell him, Nicias", or before an enclitic word such as μοι (moi) "to me", e.g. εἰπέ μοι, ὦ Σώκρατες (eipé moi, ô Sṓkrates) "tell me, Socrates". The exact pronunciation of the grave accent is disputed, but it is quite likely that it often represented absence of high pitch, i.e. normal pitch. However, there is some evidence from Greek music that in some circumstances the grave was pronounced with a degree of high pitch, for example when a pronoun with a grave such as κἀμὲ (kamè) "me too" was emphasised.
- The circumflex (Greek: περισπωμένη (perispōménē)), displayed as either a tilde ( ˜ ) or an inverted breve ( ̑ ) is used only on long vowels. It is typically found (a) where a long-vowel penultimate syllable which has the accent is followed by a short-vowel final syllable (e.g. δῆμος (dêmos) "people"); (b) where a contraction of an accented vowel plus an unaccented vowel has taken place: e.g.: φιλέει (philéei) > φιλεῖ (phileî) "he" or "she loves"; (c) in the genitive plural of all 1st declension nouns and all 3rd declension nouns of the type τεῖχος (teîkhos) e.g. ναυτῶν (nautôn) "of sailors", τειχῶν (teikhôn) "of walls"; (d) in the genitive and the dative case of the article and of all nouns and adjectives whose final syllable is accented, e.g. nominative φωνή (phōnḗ) "a sound", but genitive φωνῆς (phōnês), dative φωνῇ (phōnêi). The circumflex appears to have indicated a fall from a high pitch to a low pitch on the same vowel, and quite often in Greek musical fragments it is represented by two notes, the first higher than the second.

== General outline ==
=== Nouns ===
==== Gender ====
In Ancient Greek, all nouns, including proper nouns, are classified according to grammatical gender as masculine, feminine, or neuter. The gender of a noun is shown by the definite article (the word ὁ, ἡ, τό (ho, hē, tó) "the") which goes with it, or by any adjective which describes it:

ὁ θεός (ho theós) "the god" (masculine)
ἡ γυνή (hē gunḗ) "the woman" (feminine)
τὸ δῶρον (tò dôron) "the gift" (neuter)

Words referring to males are usually masculine, females are usually feminine, but there are some exceptions, such as τὸ τέκνον (tò téknon) "the child" (neuter). Inanimate objects can be of any gender, for example ὁ ποταμός (ho potamós) "the river" is masculine, ἡ πόλις (hē pólis) "the city" is feminine, and τὸ δένδρον (tò déndron) "the tree" is neuter.

A peculiarity of neuter words in Ancient Greek is that when a plural neuter noun or pronoun is used as the subject of a verb, the verb is singular, for example:

ταῦτα πάντ’ ἐστὶν καλά.
taûta pánt’ estìn kalá.
These things are (lit. "is") all beautiful.

==== Number ====
Nouns, adjectives, and pronouns also vary as to number. They can be singular, dual (referring to two people or things), or plural (referring to two or more):

ὁ θεός (ho theós) "the god" (singular)
τὼ θεώ (tṑ theṓ) "the two gods" (dual)
οἱ θεοί (hoi theoí) "the gods" (plural)

As can be seen from the above examples, the difference between singular, dual, and plural is generally shown in Greek by changing the ending of the noun, and the article also changes for different numbers.

The dual number is used for a pair of things, for example τὼ χεῖρε (tṑ kheîre) "two hands", τοῖν δυοῖν τειχοῖν (toîn duoîn teikhoîn) "of the two walls". It is, however, not very common; for example, the dual article τώ (tṓ) is found no more than 90 times in the comedies of Aristophanes, and only 3 times in the historian Thucydides. There are special verb endings for the dual as well.

==== Cases ====
Nouns, pronouns, adjectives and the article in Ancient Greek also change according to their function in the sentence. For example:

ἡ γυνή (hē gunḗ) "the woman" (subject)
τὴν γυναῖκα (tḕn gunaîka) "the woman" (direct object)
τῆς γυναικός (tês gunaikós) "of the woman"
τῇ γυναικί (têi gunaikí) "to, for, or with the woman"

These different forms are called different cases of the noun. The four principal cases are called the nominative (subject), accusative (direct object), genitive (of), and dative (to, for, with).

In addition, some nouns also have a separate vocative case, used for addressing a person:

γύναι (gúnai) "madam!"

Frequently a vocative is preceded by the word ὦ (ô) "o": ὦ γύναι (ô gúnai) "madam!". Where there is no separate vocative case (which is the case for all plural nouns), the nominative is used instead.

The order in which the cases are given differs in American and British textbooks. In American grammars, such as H. W. Smyth's Greek Grammar (1920), the order is Nom. – Gen. – Dat. – Acc. – Voc.; in grammars produced in Britain and countries formerly under British influence the order is Nom. – Voc. – Acc. – Gen. – Dat.

==== Prepositions ====
The accusative, genitive, and dative cases are also used after prepositions, for example:

πρὸς τὴν γυναῖκα (pròs tḕn gunaîka) "to the woman" (accusative)
ἀπὸ τῆς γυναικός (apò tês gunaikós) "away from the woman" (genitive)
σὺν τῇ γυναικί (sùn têi gunaikí) "along with the woman" (dative)

Usually prepositions which mean "towards" such as πρός (prós) are followed by a noun or pronoun in the accusative case, while those that mean "away from" are followed by one in the genitive. Some prepositions can be followed by more than one case depending on the meaning. For example, μετά (metá) means "with" when followed by a noun in the genitive, but "after" if followed by an accusative.

==== Declensions ====
Nouns differ as to their endings. For example, the nominative plurals of regular masculine and feminine nouns can end in -αι (-ai), -οι (-oi) or -ες (-es). They are divided into three different groups, called declensions, according to these endings and the endings of the other cases:

αἱ θεαί (hai theaí) "the goddesses" – 1st declension
οἱ θεοί (hoi theoí) "the gods" – 2nd declension
αἱ γυναῖκες (hai gunaîkes) "the women" – 3rd declension

1st declension nouns tend to be feminine (but there are some exceptions such as στρατιώτης (stratiṓtēs) "a soldier"), 2nd declension nouns tend to be masculine (again with exceptions).

==== Neuter nouns ====
Neuter nouns and adjectives differ from masculine and feminine ones in that they do not have a separate ending for the accusative case, but the nominative, vocative, and accusative are always identical, both in the singular and plural. They are divided into the 2nd and 3rd declensions according to the endings of their genitive and dative cases, which are the same as those of masculine nouns and adjectives.

Neuter words in the nominative and accusative plural have the endings -α (-a) or -η (-ē):

τὰ δένδρα (tà déndra) "the trees" – 2nd declension
τὰ τείχη (tà teíkhē) "the walls" – 3rd declension

=== Personal pronouns ===
The independent personal pronouns are as follows. For substitutes for the third-person, see the note below.

	1st person			2nd person			3rd person		
	Singular	Dual	Plural	Singular	Dual	Plural	Singular	Dual	Plural
Nominative	ἐγώ (egṓ)	νώ (nṓ)	ἡμεῖς (hēmeîs)	σύ (sú)	σφώ (sphṓ)	ὑμεῖς (hūmeîs)	(NA)	σφωέ (sphōé)	σφεῖς (spheîs)
Accusative	ἐμέ (emé)	νώ (nṓ)	ἡμᾶς (hēmâs)	σέ (sé)	σφώ (sphṓ)	ὑμᾶς (hūmâs)	ἕ (hé)	σφωέ (sphōé)	σφᾶς (sphâs)
Genitive	ἐμοῦ (emoû)	νῷν (nôin)	ἡμῶν (hēmôn)	σοῦ (soû)	σφῷν (sphôin)	ὑμῶν (hūmôn)	οὗ (hoû)	σφωῐ̈ν (sphōïn)	σφῶν (sphôn)
Dative	ἐμοί (emoí)	νῷν (nôin)	ἡμῖν (hēmîn)	σοί (soí)	σφῷν (sphôin)	ὑμῖν (hūmîn)	οἷ (hoî)	σφωῐ̈ν (sphōïn)	σφίσι (sphísi)

The oblique cases have enclitic forms in the singular, when the pronoun is not emphatic; these lack stress and in the first person drop the initial vowel: -με, -μου, -μοι; -σε, -σου, -σοι; -ἑ, -οὑ, -οἱ. More emphatic 1sg ἔγωγε, ἔμεγε, ἐμοῦγε, ἔμοιγε and 2sg σύγε also occur.

The initial ὑ vowel in the 2nd-person plural forms is long.

The independent forms in the third-person are uncommon, apart from the dative used as an indirect reflexive. Usually ἐκεῖνος, οὗτος, etc. are used instead for the nominative, and αὐτός (in the appropriate case) for the oblique.

=== Definite article ===
Attic Greek has a definite article, but no indefinite article. Thus ἡ πόλις (hē pólis) "the city", but πόλις (pólis) "a city". The definite article agrees with its associated noun in number, gender and case.

The article is more widely used in Greek than the word the in English. For example, proper names often take a definite article (e.g. (ὁ) Σωκράτης, ho Sōkrátēs, "Socrates"), as do abstract nouns (e.g. ἡ σοφίᾱ, hē sophíā, "wisdom"). It is also used in combination with possessive adjectives and demonstratives in phrases such as ἡ ἐμὴ πόλις (hē emḕ pólis) "my city" and αὕτη ἡ πόλις (haútē hē pólis) "this city".

Adjectives are usually placed between the article and noun, e.g. ὁ ἐμὸς πατήρ (ho emòs patḗr) "my father", but sometimes after the noun, in which case the article is repeated before the adjective: ὁ πατὴρ ὁ ἐμός (ho patḕr ho emós) "my father". Dependent genitive noun phrases can also be positioned between the article and noun, for example ἡ τοῦ ἀνθρώπου φύσις (hē toû anthrṓpou phúsis) "the nature of man" (Plato), although other positions are possible, e.g. ἡ ψῡχὴ τοῦ ἀνθρώπου (hē psūkhḕ toû anthrṓpou) "the soul of man" (Plato).

Sometimes the article alone can be used with a genitive, with the noun understood from the context, for example τὰ τῆς πόλεως (tà tês póleōs) "the (affairs) of the city", standing for τὰ τῆς πόλεως πρᾱ́γματα (tà tês póleōs prā́gmata); Περικλῆς ὁ Ξανθίππου (Periklês ho Xanthíppou) "Pericles the (son) of Xanthippus", standing for Περικλῆς ὁ υἱὸς τοῦ Ξανθίππου (Periklês ho huiòs toû Xanthíppou).

Another use of the article in Ancient Greek is with an infinitive, adjective, adverb, or a participle to make a noun, for example, τὸ ἀδικεῖν (tò adikeîn) "wrong-doing, doing wrong"; τὸ καλόν (tò kalón) "the beautiful, beauty"; τὰ γενόμενα (tà genómena) "the events, the things that happened"; οἱ παρόντες (hoi paróntes) "the people present".

In earlier Greek, for instance Homeric Greek, there was no definite article as such, the corresponding forms still having their original use as demonstrative pronouns. The article is also omitted in classical Greek tragedy (except when the meaning is "that"), but it is used in comedy.

The definite article is declined thus:

	Masculine			Feminine			Neuter		
	Singular	Dual	Plural	Singular	Dual (Note: The forms τᾱ́ (tā́) and ταῖν (taîn) for feminine duals also exist, but are rare, e.g. Plato, Leg. 775e, 955d.)	Plural	Singular	Dual	Plural
Nominative	ὁ (ho)	τώ (tṓ)	οἱ (hoi)	ἡ (hē)	τώ (tṓ)	αἱ (hai)	τό (tó)	τώ (tṓ)	τά (tá)
Accusative	τόν (tón)	τώ (tṓ)	τούς (toús)	τήν (tḗn)	τώ (tṓ)	τᾱ́ς (tā́s)	τό (tó)	τώ (tṓ)	τά (tá)
Genitive	τοῦ (toû)	τοῖν (toîn)	τῶν (tôn)	τῆς (tês)	τοῖν (toîn)	τῶν (tôn)	τοῦ (toû)	τοῖν (toîn)	τῶν (tôn)
Dative	τῷ (tôi)	τοῖν (toîn)	τοῖς (toîs)	τῇ (têi)	τοῖν (toîn)	ταῖς (taîs)	τῷ (tôi)	τοῖν (toîn)	τοῖς (toîs)

=== Adjectives ===
Ancient Greek adjectives agree with the nouns they modify in case, gender, and number. There are several different declension patterns for adjectives, and most of them resemble various noun declensions. The boundary between adjectives and nouns is somewhat fuzzy in Ancient Greek: adjectives are frequently used on their own without a noun, and Greek grammarians called both of them ὄνομα (ónoma), meaning "name" or "noun".

=== Verbs ===
Verbs have four moods (indicative, imperative, subjunctive and optative), three voices (active, middle and passive), as well as three persons (first, second and third) and three numbers (singular, dual, and plural). The dual, which exists only in the 2nd and 3rd persons (you both, they both), is rarely used.

==== Indicative mood ====
The indicative mood is the form of the verb used for making statements of fact.

In the indicative mood, verbs have up to seven tenses. These are as follows, using the regular verb παιδεύω (paideúō) "I teach":

Primary tenses:

- Present: παιδεύω (paideúō) "I teach", "I am teaching", "I have been teaching"
- Future: παιδεύσω (paideúsō) "I will teach"
- Perfect: πεπαίδευκα (pepaídeuka) "I have taught"
- Future perfect: πεπαιδευκὼς ἔσομαι (pepaideukṑs ésomai) "I will have taught" (very rare)

Secondary tenses:

- Imperfect: ἐπαίδευον (epaídeuon) "I was teaching", "I began teaching", "I used to teach", "I taught", "I had been teaching"
- Aorist: ἐπαίδευσα (epaídeusa) "I taught", "I have taught"
- Pluperfect: ἐπεπαιδεύκη/ἐπεπαιδεύκειν (epepaideúkē/epepaideúkein) "I had taught" (rare)

Of these, the imperfect and pluperfect tenses are found in the indicative only.

==== Tense stems ====
In order to make the secondary tenses of the indicative an augment (usually consisting of the prefix ἐ- (e-)) is added at the beginning of the verb, e.g. κελεύω (keleúō) "I order" but ἐκέλευον (ekéleuon) "I ordered". When the verb begins with a vowel, this augment is realised as a lengthening and often change of quality of the vowel, e.g. ἄγω (ágō) "I lead" but ἦγον (êgon) "I was leading". This augment is found only in the indicative, not in the other moods or in the participle or infinitives.

To make the perfect and pluperfect tenses, the first consonant of the verb's root is usually repeated with the vowel ε (e), for example: γράφω, γέγραφα (gégrapha) "I write, I have written", λῡ́ω, λέλυκα (lū́ō, léluka) "I free, I have freed", διδάσκω, δεδίδαχα (didáskō, dedídakha) "I teach, I have taught" (all present, perfect). This is called "reduplication". Some verbs, however, where reduplication is not convenient, use an augment instead, e.g. ἔσχον, ἔσχηκα (éskhon, éskhēka) "I had, I have had" (aorist, perfect), εὑρίσκω, ηὕρηκα (heurískō, hēúrēka) "I find, I have found" (present, perfect). This reduplication or perfect-tense augment appears in every part of the verb, not in the indicative only.

==== Other moods ====
As well as the indicative mood, Ancient Greek had an imperative, subjunctive, and optative mood.

- The imperative mood is found in three tenses (present, aorist, and perfect). The aorist is used when the speaker wants something done at once, e.g. δότε μοι (dóte moi) "give it to me at once!" A 3rd person imperative is also possible in Greek: ἀπαγέτω τις αὐτὴν (apagétō tis autḕn) "someone take her away!" The present imperative is used when the command is general: μὴ ψεύδου ἀλλ᾿ ἀλήθευε (mḕ pseúdou all᾿ alḗtheue) "don't lie, but (always) tell the truth".
- The subjunctive mood is found in the same three tenses. In independent clauses it states what the speaker suggests "should" happen; it is also used for deliberative questions ("what should I do?"). Another very common use is in indefinite conditional or temporal ("time") clauses, such as "if this should happen" or "whenever this happens". It can also be used to make purpose clauses and to express fears ("I fear that this may happen"). The subjunctive usually has the letter η (ē) or ω (ō) in the ending, e.g. ἴωμεν (íōmen) "let's go".
- The optative mood is used for wishes ("may it happen!"), and also for referring to events in a hypothetical future situation ("this would happen"). Other common uses are in indefinite temporal clauses in past time ("whenever it happened"), and to express purpose and fears in past time. Finally, the optative is also used to express indirect speech in past time. The optative usually has the letters οι (oi), αι (ai) or ει (ei) in the verb ending, e.g. μὴ γένοιτο (mḕ génoito) "may it not happen!"

==== Voices ====
Greek verbs can be found in any of three voices: active, passive, and middle.

- Active verbs in Greek are those whose 1st person singular in the present tense ends in -ω (-ō) or -μι (-mi), such as κελεύω (keleúō) "I order" or εἰμί (eimí) "I am".
- Passive verbs, such as κελεύομαι (keleúomai) "I am ordered (by someone)" have a different set of endings, with the 1st singular of the present tense ending in -ομαι (-omai) or -μαι (-mai). A passive verb can be defined as one which refers to an action which is done by someone or by something (even if the person by whom it was done is not expressly stated).
- Middle verbs are those with the -ομαι (-omai) endings which are not passive in meaning. Often they refer to actions which someone does to themselves or for their own benefit, such as λούομαι (loúomai) "I get washed", ἵσταμαι (hístamai) "I stand", or παύομαι (paúomai) "I stop". Some middle verbs such as μάχομαι (mákhomai) "I fight" refer to reciprocal actions done by people to each other.

Often middle verbs have no active counterpart, such as γίγνομαι (gígnomai) "I become" or δέχομαι (dékhomai) "I receive". These verbs are called deponent verbs.

The forms of the verb for middle and passive voices largely overlap, except in the aorist and future tenses where there are separate forms for middle and passive.

=== Infinitives ===
Ancient Greek has a number of infinitives. They can be of any voice (active, middle, or passive) and in any of five tenses (present, aorist, perfect, future, and future perfect). Commonly used endings for the infinitive are -ειν (-ein), -σαι (-sai), -(ε)ναι (-(e)nai) and in the middle or passive -(ε)σθαι (-(e)sthai).

The infinitive can be used with or without the definite article. With the article (which is always neuter singular), it has a meaning similar to the English gerund: τὸ ἀδικεῖν (tò adikeîn) "wrong-doing", "doing wrong".

When used without the article, the infinitive has a number of different uses; for example, just as in English it is used dependent on verbs meaning "want", "am able", "it is necessary", "it is possible" and so on:

βούλομαι περὶ τούτων εἰπεῖν.
boúlomai perì toútōn eipeîn.
I want to speak about these things.

In Greek the infinitive can also be used in indirect commands (e.g. "he ordered him to...", "he persuaded him to...") where the main verb is followed by an object plus infinitive:

ἐκέλευσεν εἰσελθεῖν Ξενοφῶντα.
ekéleusen eiseltheîn Xenophônta.
He invited Xenophon to come in.

The distinction between the present and aorist infinitive in a context like the above is one of aspect rather than of time. In both of the above examples, the aorist infinitive is used, implying "to do at once", as opposed to "to do in general" or "regularly".

Another frequent use of the infinitive is to make an indirect statement, especially after verbs such as φημί (phēmí) "I say" and οἴμαι (oímai) "I think". As above, there are two constructions, one where the plain infinitive is used (this happens when the subject of the infinitive and the subject of the main verb are the same, i.e. coreferential):

οἴομαι τοῦτο ποιήσειν οὐ χαλεπῶς.
oíomai toûto poiḗsein ou khalepôs.
I think that I will do this without difficulty (lit. "I think to be going to do this").

The other is where the subject of the infinitive and the subject of the main verb are different. In this type, the subject of the infinitive is put in the accusative case, as in the following example:

φασὶ τὴν ψυχὴν τοῦ ἀνθρώπου εἶναι ἀθάνατον.
phasì tḕn psukhḕn toû anthrṓpou eînai athánaton.
They say that the soul of man is immortal (lit. "to be immortal").

Although the infinitive was widely used in Ancient Greek, it gradually fell out of use in spoken Greek, and in modern Greek it no longer exists. Instead of "I want to go", a construction with the subjunctive mood is used equivalent to "I want that I go".

=== Participles ===
Ancient Greek makes frequent use of participles, which are verbal adjectives. Participles are found in all three voices (Active, Middle, and Passive) and in five different tenses (present, aorist, perfect, future, and future perfect). Because they are adjectival in form, they also come in three genders (masculine, feminine, and neuter), three numbers (singular, dual, and plural), and four different cases (nominative, accusative, genitive, and dative). Despite being adjectival, they also function as verbs, and can, for example, take a direct object like any other verb. For example, from the verb λύω (lúō) "I free or untie" come the following participles (cited here in the masculine singular nominative):

- λύων (lúōn) (present) "freeing", "untying"
- λύσας (lúsas) (aorist) "after freeing", "having freed"
- λελυκώς (lelukṓs) (perfect) "having (already) freed"
- λύσων (lúsōn) (future) "going to free", "in order to free"

Participles are used in various ways in Greek. Often, for example, the first of two verbs is replaced by an aorist participle:

ταῦτ’ εἰπὼν ἐκαθέζετο.
taût’ eipṑn ekathézeto.
After saying this, he sat down.

A participle can also be used with the definite article, with the meaning "the one who" or "those who":

τίνες οἱ λέγοντες;
tínes hoi légontes?
Who are the people who say this?

A participle can also be used dependent on certain verbs, for example, verbs of perception, representing an independent clause (this is known as the "supplementary" participle):

ᾔσθετο τὴν νόσον οὐκ ἀποφευξόμενος.
ḗistheto tḕn nóson ouk apopheuxómenos.
He realised that he was not going to escape the disease.

=== Verbal adjectives ===
==== Verbal adjective in -τέος (-téos) ====
The gerundive is a verbal adjective that indicates the necessity for the action of the verb to be performed. It takes the nominative endings -τέος, -τέᾱ, -τέον (-téos, -téā, -téon), declining like a normal first/second declension adjective. Its stem is normally of the same form as the aorist passive, but with φ changed to π and χ to κ, e.g.

- παύω → παυστέος (paúō → paustéos) "to be stopped"
- λαμβάνω → ληπτέος (lambánō → lēptéos) "to be taken"

There are two ways of using the gerundive in Greek. One is passively, somewhat like the gerundive in Latin, with the person who has to do the action in the dative case:

ποταμὸς ... τις ἄλλος ἡμῖν ἐστι διαβατέος.
potamòs ... tis állos hēmîn esti diabatéos.
There is another river which we must cross (lit. to be crossed for us).

The other is actively, and impersonally, with the neuter singular ending -τέον (-téon); in this form it may take an object. Again the person who has to do the action, if mentioned, is put in the dative case:

τὸν θάνατον ἡμῖν μετ’ εὐδοξίας αἱρετέον ἐστί.
tòn thánaton hēmîn met’ eudoxías hairetéon estí.
It is necessary for us to choose death with glory.

In some sentences either interpretation is possible:

τὸ χωρίον αἱρετέον.
tò khōríon hairetéon.
The fort must be captured / it is necessary to capture the fort.

Although the Greek gerundive resembles the Latin one, it is used far less frequently. Another way of expressing necessity in Greek is to use the impersonal verb δεῖ (deî) "it is necessary", followed by an accusative and infinitive:

δεῖ αὐτὸν ἀποθανεῖν.
deî autòn apothaneîn.
It is necessary for him to die (he must die).

==== Verbal adjective in -τός (-tós) ====
There is another verbal adjective ending in -τός (-tós), which in some verbs has the meaning of a perfect participle passive (e.g. κρυπτός (kruptós) "hidden"), and in other verbs expresses possibility (e.g. δυνατός (dunatós) "possible").

=== Time and aspect ===
One of the most notable features that Ancient Greek has inherited from Proto-Indo-European is its use of verb "tense" to express both tense proper (present, past, or future) and the aspect of the time (as ongoing, simply taking place, or completed with a lasting result). The aspectual relation is expressed by the tenses in all the moods, while the temporal relation is only expressed in the indicative and to a more limited extent in the other moods (also called the dependent moods).

With regard to the time relation that they express in the indicative, the seven tense-aspects are divided into two categories:

- Primary: denoting present or future time. These are the present tense (in its ordinary use), perfect, future tense and the rare future perfect.
- Secondary (also called historical), denoting past time. The secondary tenses are the imperfect, pluperfect, and the aorist (in its ordinary uses).

This classification, which properly applies only to forms of the indicative, is also extended to the dependent moods in the cases where they express the same time relation as the indicative. The time relation expressed by a verb's tense may be present, past or future with reference to the time of the utterance or with reference to the time of another verb with which the verb in question is connected. Compare for instance ἀληθές ἐστιν "it's true" with εἶπον ὅτι ἀληθὲς εἴη "I said that it was true" or "I said 'it's true'".

A verb also expresses one of three possible aspects, irrespective of the mood it may be in:

- Imperfective aspect: indicating an ongoing, continuous, or repeated action. The present and the imperfect convey this aspect.
- Perfective aspect (traditionally also called aorist aspect in Greek grammar): indicating that the action is started and concluded at the same time, or that the action is focused on a single point in time, or that the action simply occurs without reference to its duration or lasting effect. The aorist conveys this aspect in all moods.
- Perfect (traditionally also often called perfective, but not to be confused with the above): indicating that the action is completed with a result that remains into the time being considered. The perfect (in all moods) as well as the pluperfect and future perfect carry this combination of relative tense and aspect.

=== Mood of the dependent verb ===
The rules on mood sequence (consecutio modorum) determine the mood of verbs in subordinate clauses in a way analogous to but more flexible than the Latin rules on time sequence (consecutio temporum) that determine their tense.

Putting aside special cases and exceptions, these rules can be formulated as follows:

- In dependent sentences, where the construction allows both the subjunctive and the optative, the subjunctive is used if the leading verb is primary, and the optative if it is secondary. E.g. πράττουσιν ἃ ἂν βούλωνται, "they do whatever they want"; but ἐπραττον ἃ βούλοιντο, "they did whatever they wanted".
- Similarly, where the construction allows both the indicative and the optative, the indicative follows primary, and the optative follows secondary tenses. E.g. λέγουσιν ὅτι τοῦτο βούλονται, "they say they want this"; εἶπον ὅτι τοῦτο βούλοιντο, "they said they wanted this".

== See also ==
- Koine Greek grammar
- Modern Greek grammar
- Prosody (Greek)
