= Andreas Paraschos =

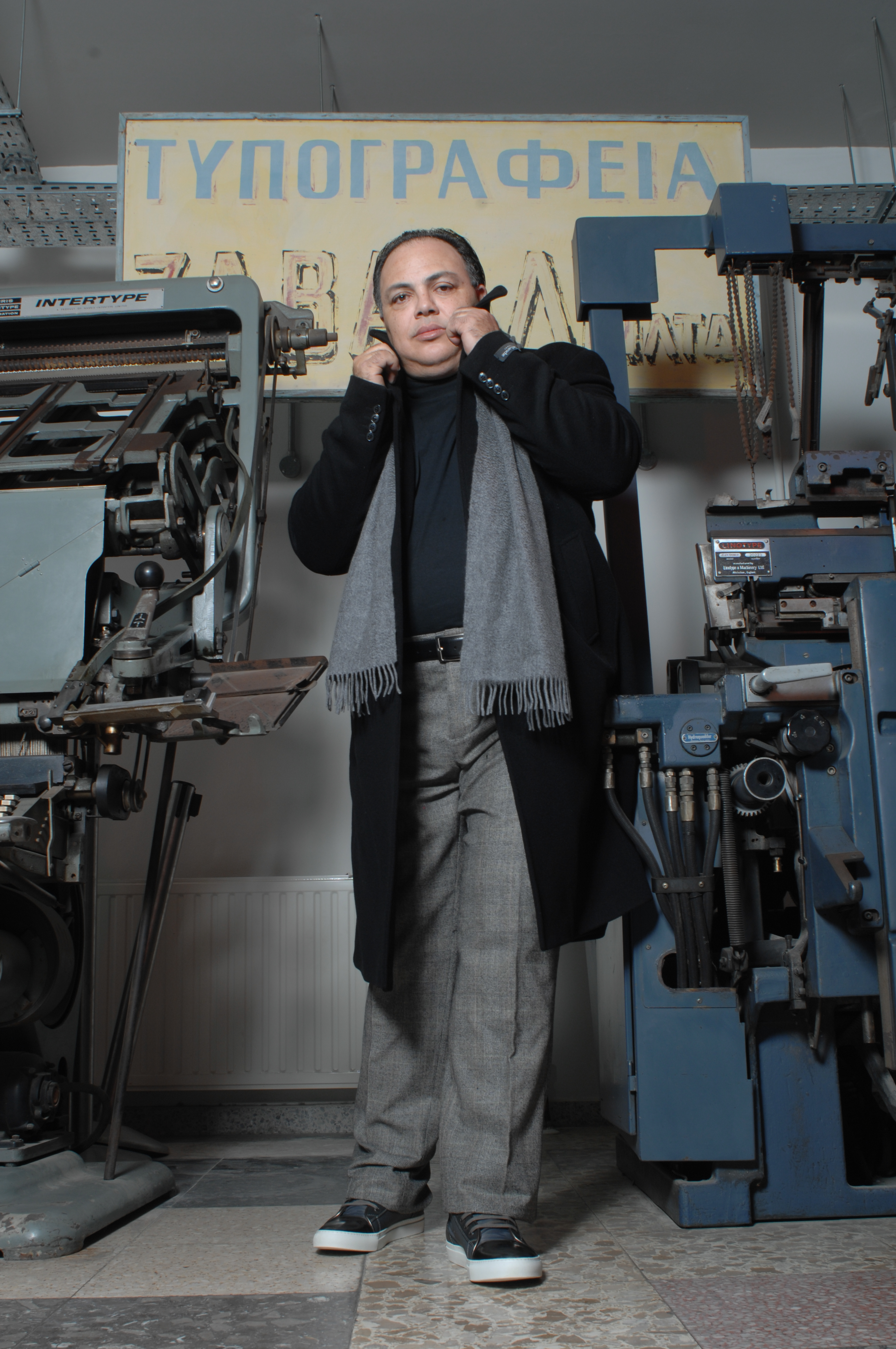
- Andreas Paraschos at printing house

Background information
- Origin: Cyprus
- Occupations: Journalist, Chief editor, lyricist

Andreas Paraschos (born April 1958) is a Cypriot journalist known for being the former director of Kathimerini, a daily morning newspaper published in Nicosia, Cyprus.

Born in Larnaca, Paraschos studied international journalism in Moscow, graduating with a Master of Arts degree in International Journalism in 1987. He returned to Cyprus in 1987 and began working in various media. In 1995, he joined the large newspaper Phileleftheros where he worked in “Selides”. There he initiated an investigation about persons missing from the Cypriot tragedy, revealing among other things that over 100 victims in the invasion had been buried in the cemeteries of Lakatameia and Constantine and Helen in Nicosia. From that point began the process of exhumations and identification through scientific DNA analysis.

In January 1999, he joined a group that aimed to release the newspaper Politis. In 2001, he became its Chief Editor. In 2008, he moved to a newly created newspaper, "Kathimerini" (newspaper in Cyprus, not to be confused with the Athenian "Kathimerini" in Greece) as chief editor, a position he retained until 13 January 2021.
