= Benedictive mood =

Grammatical mood rarely found in Sanskrit, expressing a blessing or wish

The benedictive mood is a grammatical mood found in Sanskrit. It expresses a blessing or wish, such as found in the English expressions "long live the king" or "may the force be with you".

For verbs in the active voice (parasmaipada), it is formed by adding endings very similar to the athematic optative endings directly to the verb root itself. Essentially, the sibilant -s is inserted between the optative marker -yā and the personal endings. By the action of the rules of sandhi, the second- and third-person benedictive endings are identical to the corresponding optative endings (-yāst turns into -yāt for the third person, and -yāss into yās for the second person).

Middle voice (ātmanepada) benedictives are not found in Classical Sanskrit.

verb root bhū in the benedictive:
	Active		
	Singular	Dual	Plural
1st Person	bhūyāsam	bhūyāsva	bhūyāsma
2nd Person	bhūyās	bhūyāstam	bhūyāsta
3rd Person	bhūyāt	bhūyāstām	bhūyāsus

== Bibliography ==
- Devavāṇīpraveśikā: An Introduction to the Sanskrit Language – Robert P. Goldman – ISBN 0-944613-40-3
- A Sanskrit Grammar for Students – A. A. Macdonell – ISBN 81-246-0094-5
