= Augment (Indo-European) =

Prefix in certain Indo-European languages

The augment is an Indo-European verbal prefix used in Indo-Iranian, Greek, Phrygian, Armenian, and Albanian, to indicate past time. The augment might be either a Proto-Indo-European archaic feature lost elsewhere or a common innovation in those languages. In the oldest attested daughter languages, such as Vedic Sanskrit and early Greek, it is used optionally. The same verb forms when used without the augment are referred to as injunctive forms (because of one of their attested senses).

The augment originally appears to have been a separate word, with the potential meaning of 'there, then', which in time got fused to the verb. The augment is *h₁é- in PIE (é- in Greek, á- in Sanskrit) and always bears the accent.

== Greek ==
The predominant scholarly view on the prehistory of the augment is that it was originally a separate grammatical particle, although dissenting opinions have occasionally been voiced.

=== Homeric Greek ===
In Homer, past-tense (aorist or imperfect) verbs appeared both with and without an augment.

ὣς φάτο — ὣς ἔφατο
hṑs pháto — hṑs éphato
"so he/she said"

ἦμος δ᾿ ἠριγένεια φάνη ῥοδοδάκτυλος Ἠώς,
êmos d' ērigéneia phánē rhododáktulos Ēṓs,
"And when rose-fingered Dawn appeared, early-born,"

=== Ancient Greek ===
In Ancient Greek, the verb λέγω légo "I say" has the aorist ἔλεξα élexa "I said." The initial ε e is the augment. When it comes before a consonant, it is called the "syllabic augment" because it adds a syllable. Sometimes the syllabic augment appears before a vowel because the initial consonant of the verbal root (usually digamma) was lost:

- *έ-ϝιδον *é-widon → (loss of digamma) *ἔιδον *éidon → (synaeresis) εἶδον eîdon

When the augment is added before a vowel, the augment and the vowel are contracted and the vowel becomes long: ἀκούω akoúō "I hear", ἤκουσα ḗkousa "I heard". It is sometimes called the "temporal augment" because it increases the time needed to pronounce the vowel.

=== Modern Greek ===
Unaccented syllabic augments disappeared in some dialects during the Byzantine period as a result of the loss of unstressed initial syllables, this feature being inherited by Standard Modern Greek. However, accented syllabic augments have remained in place. So Ancient ἔλυσα, ἐλύσαμεν (élūsa, elū́samen) "I loosened, we loosened" corresponds to Modern έλυσα, λύσαμε (élisa, lísame). When the stem begins in a vowel, the augment has not survived in the vernacular and the vowel is left unaltered instead: Ancient ἀγαπῶ, ἠγάπησα (agapô, ēgápēsa) "I love, I loved"; Modern αγαπώ, αγάπησα (agapó, agápisa).

== Sanskrit ==
The augment is used in Sanskrit to form the imperfect, aorist, pluperfect (Note: Or the past perfect. Rare in Vedic and only one or two forms attested in the later language.) and conditional. When the verb has a prefix, the augment always sits between the prefix and the root. The following examples of verb forms in the third-person singular illustrate the phenomenon:

| | √bhū- | sam + √bhū- (Note: 'to be together, be possible, etc') |
|---|---|---|
| Present | bháv·a·ti | sam·bháv·a·ti |
| Imperfect | á·bhav·a·t | sam·á·bhav·a·t |
| Aorist | á·bhū·t | sam·á·bhū·t |
| Conditional | á·bhav·iṣya·t | sam·á·bhav·iṣya·t |

When the root starts with any of the vowels i-, u- or ṛ, the vowel is subject not to guṇa but vṛddhi.

- icch·á·ti -> aí·cch·a·t
- urṇó·ti -> aú·rṇo·t
- ṛdh·nó·ti -> ā́r·dh·no·t

== Other ==
- Phrygian seems to have had an augment.
- Classical Armenian had an augment, in the form of e-.
- Yaghnobi, an East Iranian language spoken in Tajikistan, has an augment.

== Constructed languages ==
In J. R. R. Tolkien's Quenya, the repetition of the first vowel before the perfect (for instance utúlië, perfect tense of túlë, "come") is reminiscent of the Indo-European augment in both form and function, and is referred to by the same name in Tolkien's grammar of the language.

== See also ==
- Sanskrit verbs
- Ancient Greek verbs
- Proto-Indo-European verbs

== Bibliography ==
- Burrow, T (2001). The Sanskrit Language (2001 ed.). Motilal Banarsidass. ISBN 81-208-1767-2.
- Clackson, James (2007). Indo-European Linguistics. Cambridge. ISBN 978-0-521-65313-8.
- Fortson, Benjamin W (2010). Indo-European Language and Culture (2010 ed.). Wiley-Blackwell. ISBN 978-1-4051-8895-1.
- Olander, Thomas, ed. (2022). The Indo-European Language Family: A Phylogenetic Perspective. Cambridge University Press. doi:10.1017/9781108758666. ISBN 978-1-108-49979-8. S2CID 161016819.
  - van Beek, Lucien. "Chapter 11: Greek". In Olander (2022).
  - Olsen, Birgit Anette; Thorsø, Rasmus. "Chapter 12: Armenian". In Olander (2022).
  - Hyllested, Adam; Joseph, Brian D. "Chapter 13: Albanian". In Olander (2022).
  - Kümmel, Martin Joachim. "Chapter 14: Indo-Iranian". In Olander (2022).
- Whitney, William Dwight (January 2008). Sanskrit Grammar (2000 ed.). Motilal Banarsidass. ISBN 978-81-208-0620-7.
