= Active voice =

Grammatical voice

Active voice is a grammatical voice prevalent in many of the world's languages. It is the default voice for clauses that feature a transitive verb in nominative–accusative languages, including English and most Indo-European languages. In these languages, a verb is typically in the active voice when the subject of the verb is the doer of the action.

In active voice, the subject of the sentence performs the action expressed by the main verb and is thus the agent. For example, in the sentence "The cat ate the fish", 'the cat' functions as the agent performing the action of eating.

== Examples ==
Below are examples demonstrating the active and passive voices with pairs of sentences using the same transitive verb across various languages.

Language	Active voice	Passive voice
Afrikaans	Die hond het die posbode gebyt The dog bit the postal carrier.	Die posbode is deur die hond gebyt The postal carrier was bitten by the dog.
Turkish	Köpek, postacıyı ısırdı. The dog bit the postal carrier.	Postacı, köpek tarafından ısırıldı. The postal carrier was bitten by the dog.
English	The dog bit the postal carrier.	The postal carrier was bitten by the dog.
Dutch	De hond beet de postbezorger The dog bit the postal carrier.	De postbezorger werd gebeten door de hond The postal carrier was bitten by the dog.
Arabic	عَضّ الكلبُ ساعي البريد 'ad alkalbu sa'eya albareed The dog bit the postal carrier.	عُضّ ساعي البريد بواسطة الكلب 'oud sa'eya albareed biwasitat alkalb The postal carrier was bitten by the dog.
French	Le chien a mordu le facteur The dog bit the postal carrier.	Le facteur a été mordu par le chien The postal carrier was bitten by the dog.
German	Der Hund biss den Postboten; The dog bit the postal carrier.	Der Postbote wurde vom Hund gebissen The postal carrier was bitten by the dog.
Italian	Il cane ha morso il postino The dog bit the postal carrier.	Il postino è stato morso dal cane The postal carrier was bitten by the dog.
Latin	Canis epistulārium momordit The dog bit the postman.	Epistulārius a cane morsum erat The postman was bitten by the dog.
Korean	개가 우편집배원을 물었다 gaega upyeonjibbaewon-eul mul-eossda A dog bit the postal carrier.	우편집배원은 개에게 물렸다 upyeonjibbaewon-eun gaeege mullyeossda The postal carrier was bitten by a dog.
Japanese	犬が 郵便 配達員に かんだ。 Inu-ga yūbin haitatsuin-ni kanda. A dog bit the mailman.	郵便 配達員が 犬に 噛まれた。 Yūbin haitatsuin-ga inu-ni kamareta. The mailman was bitten by the dog.
Chinese	狗 咬了 邮递员。 Gǒu yǎole yóudìyuán The dog bit the postal carrier.	邮递员 被 狗 咬了。 Yóudìyuán bèi gǒu yǎole The postal carrier was bitten by the dog.
Slovak	Pes uhryzol poštara. The dog bit the postal carrier.	Poštár bol uhryznutý psom. The postal carrier was bitten by the dog.
Polish	Pies ugryzł listonosza The dog bit the postal carrier.	Listonosz został ugryziony przez psa The postal carrier was bitten by the dog.
Spanish	El perro mordió al cartero The dog bit the postal carrier.	El cartero fue mordido por el perro The postal carrier was bitten by the dog.
Swahili	Mbwa aliuma tarishi The dog bit the postal carrier.	Tarishi aliumwa na mbwa The postal carrier was bitten by the dog.
Swedish	Hunden bet brevbäraren The dog bit the postal carrier.	Brevbäraren bets av hunden The postal carrier was bitten by the dog.
Telugu	కుక్క పోస్టల్ క్యారియర్ని కరిచింది 'kukka postal carrierni karichindi The dog bit the postal carrier.	పోస్టల్ క్యారియర్ కుక్క చేత కరవబడింది postal carrier kukka cheta karavabadindi The postal carrier was bitten by the dog.
Thai	หมา กัด บุรุษ ไปรษณีย์ H̄mā kạd burus̄ʹ pịrs̄ʹṇīy̒ The dog bit the postal carrier.	บุรุษ ไปรษณีย์ ถูก หมา กัด; Burus̄ʹ pịrs̄ʹṇīy̒ t̄hūk h̄mā kạd The postal carrier was bitten by the dog.
Filipino	ᜃᜒᜈᜄᜆ᜔ ᜅ᜔ ᜀᜐᜓ ᜀᜅ᜔ ᜃᜍ᜔ᜆᜒᜍᜓ. Kinagat ng aso ang kartero. The dog bit the postman.	ᜈᜃᜄᜆ᜔ ᜅ᜔ ᜀᜐᜓ ᜀᜅ᜔ ᜃᜍ᜔ᜆᜒᜍᜓ. Nakagat ng aso ang kartero. The postman was bitten by the dog.
Cebuano	ᜄᜒᜉᜀᜃ᜔ ᜐ ᜁᜍᜓ ᜀᜅ᜔ ᜃᜍ᜔ᜆᜒᜍᜓ. Gipaak sa iro ang kartero. The dog bit the postman.	ᜈᜉᜀᜃᜈ᜔ ᜂᜄ᜔ ᜁᜍᜓ ᜀᜅ᜔ ᜃᜍ᜔ᜆᜒᜍᜓ. Napaakan og iro ang kartero. The postman was bitten by the dog.
Ilocano	ᜃᜒᜈᜄᜆ᜔ ᜆᜒ ᜀᜐᜓ ᜆᜒ ᜃᜍ᜔ᜆᜒᜍᜓ. Kinagat ti aso ti kartero. The dog bit the postman.	ᜈᜃᜄᜆ᜔ ᜆᜒ ᜀᜐᜓ ᜆᜒ ᜃᜍ᜔ᜆᜒᜍᜓ. Nakagat ti aso ti kartero. The postman was bitten by the dog.

== See also ==
- Anti-passive voice
- Mediopassive voice
- E-Prime, a version of the English language that excludes forms of the verb to be
