= Irrealis mood =

Grammatical mood

In linguistics, irrealis moods (abbreviated irr) are the main set of grammatical moods that indicate that a certain situation or action is not known to have happened at the moment the speaker is talking. This contrasts with the realis moods. They are used in statements without truth value (imperative, interrogative, subordinate, etc).

Every language has grammatical ways of expressing unreality. Linguists tend to reserve the term "irrealis" for particular morphological markers or clause types. Many languages with irrealis mood make further subdivisions between kinds of irrealis moods. This is especially so among Algonquian languages such as Blackfoot.

== List of irrealis moods ==
Mood	Event, as intended by speaker	Example	Found in
Subjunctive (SJV or SBJV)	Event is considered unlikely (mainly used in dependent clauses).	"If I were to love you..."	English; Latin and Romance languages; German; Vedic Sanskrit; Proto-Indo-European; Hindi; Persian
Conditional (COND)	Event depends upon another condition.	"I would love you"	English; German; Romance languages; Icelandic; Irish; Hindi; Finnish; Hungarian; Polish
Optative (OPT)	Event is hoped, expected, or awaited.	"May I be loved!"	Albanian; Latin and Romance languages (as a form of the subjunctive); Ancient Greek; Sanskrit; Avestan; Proto-Indo-European
Jussive (JUS)	Event is pleaded, implored or asked.	"Everyone should be loved"	Amharic; Arabic; Hebrew; Esperanto
Potential (POT)	Event is probable or considered likely	"She probably loves me"	Finnish; Japanese; Sanskrit; Sami languages; Proto-Indo-European
Imperative (IMP); Prohibitive (PROH)	Event is directly ordered or requested by the speaker. Event is directly prohibited by the speaker.	"Love me!" "Do not love me"	English; Finnish; Hungarian; Japanese; Latin and Romance languages; Mongolian; Seri
Desiderative (DES or DESI)	Event is desired/wished by a participant in the state of affairs referred to in the utterance	"I wish he loved me."	Japanese; Mongolian; Sanskrit; Proto-Indo-European; Muniche
Dubitative (DUB)	Event is uncertain, doubtful, dubious.	"She seems to love me."	Mongolian; Ojibwe; Turkish
Hypothetical (HYP)	Event is hypothetical, or it is counterfactual, but possible.	"I might love you [if...]"	Russian; Lakota
Presumptive (PRESM)	Event is assumed, presupposed by the speaker.	"Knowing the way you love me [...]"	Romanian; Hindi; Punjabi; Gujarati
Permissive (PERM)	Event is permitted by the speaker.	"You may [not] love me..."	Lithuanian (as a form of the optative); Mongolian
Mirative (MIR); Admirative	Event is surprising or amazing (literally or in irony or sarcasm).	"Wow! They love me!", "Apparently they love me."	Turkish; Bulgarian; Macedonian; Albanian; Megleno-Romanian; Mandarin; Balkan sprachbund (merges with the inferential)
Hortative (HORT)	Event is exhorted, implored, insisted or encouraged by speaker.	"Let us love!"	Latin (as a form of the jussive); Greek (as a form of the subjunctive); Hindi; Japanese
Eventive (EVM)	Event is likely but depends upon a condition; a combination of the potential and conditional.	"I would probably love you [if...]"	Finnish (in the epic poem Kalevala); Estonian, in some dialects
Precative (PREC)	Event is requested by the speaker.	"Will you love me?"	Mongolian
Volitive (VOL)	Event is desired, wished or feared by the speaker.	"Would that you loved me!" / "God forbid [that] you love me!"	Japanese
Inferential (INFER or INFR)	Event is not witnessed and not confirmed.	"Something tells me she loves me."	Turkish; Macedonian; Bulgarian ("renarrative mood"); Estonian ("oblique mood"); Balkan sprachbund (merges with the mirative)
Necessitative (NEC)	Event is necessary, or it is both desired and encouraged; a combination of the hortative and jussive.	"It is necessary that you should love me."	Armenian; Turkish
Interrogative (INTERR)	Event is asked or questioned by the speaker	"Does he love me?"	Welsh; Nenets
Benedictive (BEND)	Event is requested or wished by the speaker in a polite or honorific fashion.	"Would you please be so kind as to love me?"	Mongolian; Sanskrit
Concessive (CONC)	Event is presupposed or admitted as part of a refutation.	"Even if she loves me [...]"; "Although she loves me [...]"	Adyghe; Mongolian
Prescriptive (PRESCR)	Event is prescribed by the speaker (though not demanded), but with the expectation that it will occur.	"Please [do not] love me."; "Go ahead, love me."	Mongolian
Admonitive (ADMON); Vetitive (VET); Apprehensive (APPR)	Event is warned against happening.	"Beware loving me."	Apma; Classical Nahuatl; Sumerian; Taba

== Moods ==
=== Subjunctive ===
The subjunctive mood, sometimes called conjunctive mood, has several uses in dependent clauses. Examples include discussing hypothetical or unlikely events, expressing opinions or emotions, or making polite requests (the exact scope is language-specific). A subjunctive mood exists in English, but it often is not obligatory. Example: "I suggested that Paul eat an apple", Paul is not in fact eating an apple. Contrast this with the sentence "Paul eats an apple", where the verb "to eat" is in the present tense, indicative mood. Another way, especially in British English, of expressing this might be "I suggested that Paul should eat an apple", derived from "Paul should eat an apple."

Other uses of the subjunctive in English, as in "And if he be not able to bring a lamb, then he shall bring for his trespass..." (KJV Leviticus 5:7), have become archaic or formal. Statements such as "I shall ensure that he leave immediately" often are formal, and often have been supplanted by constructions with the indicative, such as "I'll make sure [that] he leaves immediately". (In other situations, the verb form for subjunctive and indicative may be identical: "I'll make sure [that] you leave immediately.)

The subjunctive mood figures prominently in the grammar of the Romance languages, which require this mood for certain types of dependent clauses. This point commonly causes difficulty for English speakers learning these languages.

In certain other languages, the dubitative or the conditional moods may be employed instead of the subjunctive in referring to doubtful or unlikely events (see the main article).

=== Conditional ===
The conditional mood (abbreviated cond) is used to speak of an event whose realization is dependent upon another condition, particularly, but not exclusively, in conditional sentences. In other languages, such as Spanish or French, verbs have a specific conditional inflection. This applies also to some verbs in German, in which the conditional mood is conventionally called Konjunktiv II, differing from Konjunktiv I. In Modern English, it is a periphrastic construction, with the form would + infinitive, e.g., I would buy. Thus, the conditional version of "John eats if he is hungry" is:

English: John would eat if he were hungry
German: Johannes äße, wenn/falls er Hunger hätte

or: Johannes würde essen, wenn er Hunger hätte

French: Jean mangerait s'il avait faim
Spanish: Juan comería si tuviera hambre
Portuguese: João comeria se tivesse fome
Italian: Giovanni mangerebbe se avesse fame
Swedish: Johan skulle äta, om han var hungrig
Danish: Johan ville spise, hvis han var sulten
Norwegian Bokmål: Johan ville spise, hvis han var sulten
Norwegian Nynorsk: Johan ville eta om han var svolten
Icelandic: Jóhann myndi borða ef hann væri svangur
Dutch: Johannes zou eten als hij honger had
Irish: D'íosfadh Seán rud dá mbeadh ocras air
Hindi: जॉन खाता अगर भूख होती उसे, romanized: jôn khātā agar bhūkh hotī use

In the Romance languages, the conditional form is used primarily in the apodosis (main clause) of conditional clauses, and in a few set phrases where it expresses courtesy or doubt. The main verb in the protasis (dependent clause) is either in the subjunctive or in the indicative mood. However, this is not a universal trait: among others, in German (as above) and in Finnish the conditional mood is used in both the apodosis and the protasis.

A further example of Finnish conditional is the sentence "I would buy a house if I earned a lot of money", where in Finnish both clauses have the conditional marker -isi-: Ostaisin talon, jos ansaitsisin paljon rahaa, just like in Hungarian, which uses the marker -na/-ne/-ná/-né: Vennék egy házat, ha sokat keresnék. In Polish, the conditional marker -by also appears twice: Kupiłbym dom, gdybym zarabiał dużo pieniędzy. Because English is used as a lingua franca, a similar kind of doubling of the word 'would' is a fairly common way to misuse an English language construction.

In French, while the standard language requires the indicative in the dependent clause, using the conditional mood in both clauses is used by some speakers: Si j'aurais su, je ne serais pas venu ("If I would have known, I wouldn't have come") instead of Si j'avais su, je ne serais pas venu ("If I had known, I wouldn't have come"). However, this usage is considered incorrect and heavily stigmatized. By contrast, J'aurais su, je ne serais pas venu is considered correct. In the literary language, past unreal conditional sentences as above may take the pluperfect subjunctive in one clause or both, so that the following sentences are all valid and have the same meaning as the preceding example: Si j'eusse su, je ne serais pas venu; Si j'avais su, je ne fusse pas venu; Si j'eusse su, je ne fusse pas venu.

=== Optative ===
The optative mood expresses hopes, wishes or commands. Other uses may overlap with the subjunctive mood. Few languages have an optative as a distinct mood; some that do are Albanian, Ancient Greek, Sanskrit, Finnish, Avestan (it was also present in Proto-Indo-European, the ancestor of the aforementioned languages except for Finnish).

In Finnish, the mood may be called an "archaic" or "formal imperative", even if it has other uses; nevertheless, it at least expresses formality. For example, the ninth Article of the Universal Declaration of Human Rights begins with:

Älköön ketään pidätettäkö mielivaltaisesti
NEG.IMP.3SG anyone.PART arrest.IMP arbitrarily
"No one shall be arrested arbitrarily" (lit. "Not anyone shall be arrested arbitrarily")

where älköön pidätettäkö "shall not be arrested" is the imperative of ei pidätetä "is not arrested". Also, using the conditional mood -isi- in conjunction with the clitic -pa yields an optative meaning: olisinpa "if only I were". Here, it is evident that the wish has not been fulfilled and probably will not be.

In Sanskrit, the optative is formed by adding the secondary endings to the verb stem. The optative, as other moods, is found in active voice and middle voice. Examples: bhares "may you bear" (active) and bharethaas "may you bear [for yourself]" (middle). The optative may not only express wishes, requests and commands, but also possibilities, e.g., kadaacid goshabdena budhyeta "he might perhaps wake up due to the bellowing of cows", doubt and uncertainty, e.g., katham vidyaam Nalam "how would I be able to recognize Nala?" The optative may further be used instead of a conditional mood.

=== Jussive ===
The jussive mood (abbreviated jus) expresses plea, insistence, imploring, self-encouragement, wish, desire, intent, command, purpose or consequence. In some languages, this is distinguished from the cohortative mood in that the cohortative occurs in the first person and the jussive in the second or third. It is found in Arabic, where it is called the مجزوم (majzūm), and also in Hebrew and in the constructed language Esperanto. The rules governing the jussive in Arabic are somewhat complex.

=== Potential ===
The potential mood (abbreviated pot) is a mood of probability indicating that, in the opinion of the speaker, the action or occurrence is considered likely. It is used in many languages, including in Finnish, Japanese, and Sanskrit (as well as its ancestor Proto-Indo-European), and in the Sami languages. (In Japanese it is often called something like tentative, since potential is used to refer to a voice indicating capability to perform the action.)

In Finnish, it is mostly a literary device, as it has virtually disappeared from daily spoken language in most dialects. Its suffix is -ne-, as in *men + ne + e → mennee "(s/he/it) will probably go". Some kinds of consonant clusters simplify to geminates. In spoken language, the word kai "probably" is used instead, e.g., se kai tulee "he probably comes", instead of hän tullee.

=== Imperative ===
The imperative mood expresses direct commands, requests, and prohibitions. In many circumstances, using the imperative mood may sound blunt or even rude, so it is often used with care. Example: "Paul, do your homework now". An imperative is used to tell someone to do something without argument.

Many languages, including English, use the bare verb stem to form the imperative (such as "go", "run", "do"). Other languages, such as Seri and Latin, however, use special imperative forms.

In English, second person is implied by the imperative except when first-person plural is specified, as in "Let's go" ("Let us go").

The prohibitive mood, the negative imperative may be grammatically or morphologically different from the imperative mood in some languages. It indicates that the action of the verb is not permitted, e.g., "Do not go!" (archaically, "Go not!"). In Portuguese and Spanish, for example, the forms of the imperative are only used for the imperative itself, e.g., "vai embora!" "¡vete!" ("leave!"), whereas the subjunctive is used to form negative commands, e.g., "não vás embora!" "¡no te vayas!" ("don't leave!").

In English, the imperative is sometimes used to form a conditional sentence: e.g., "Go eastward a mile, and you will see it" means "If you go eastward a mile, you will see it".

=== Desiderative ===
Whereas the optative expresses hopes, the desiderative mood expresses wishes and desires. Desires are what we want to be the case; hope generally implies optimism toward the chances of a desire's fulfillment. If someone desires something but is pessimistic about its chances of occurring, then one desires it but does not hope for it. Few languages have a distinct desiderative mood; three that do are Sanskrit, Japanese, and Proto-Indo-European.

In Japanese the verb inflection -tai expresses the speaker's desire, e.g., watashi wa asoko ni ikitai "I want to go there". This form is treated as a pseudo-adjective: the auxiliary verb garu is used by dropping the end -i of an adjective to indicate the outward appearance of another's mental state, in this case the desire of a person other than the speaker (e.g. Jon wa tabetagatte imasu "John appears to want to eat").

In Sanskrit, the infix -sa-, sometimes -isa-, is added to the reduplicated root, e.g. jíjīviṣati "he wants to live" instead of jī́vati "he lives". The desiderative in Sanskrit may also be used as imminent: mumūrṣati "he is about to die". The Sanskrit desiderative continues Proto-Indo-European *-(h₁)se-.

=== Dubitative ===
The dubitative mood is used in Ojibwe, Turkish, Bulgarian and other languages. It expresses the speaker's doubt or uncertainty about the event denoted by the verb. For example, in Ojibwe, Baawitigong igo ayaa noongom translates as "he is in Baawitigong today." When the dubitative suffix -dog is added, this becomes Baawitigong igo ayaadog noongom, "I guess he must be in Baawitigong."

=== Presumptive ===
The presumptive mood is used in Romanian and Hindi to express presupposition or hypothesis, regardless of the fact denoted by the verb, as well as other more or less similar attitudes: doubt, curiosity, concern, condition, indifference, inevitability. Often, for a sentence in presumptive mood, no exact translation can be constructed in English which conveys the same nuance.

The Romanian sentence, acolo s-o fi dus "he must have gone there" shows the basic presupposition use, while the following excerpt from a poem by Eminescu shows the use both in a conditional clause de-o fi "suppose it is" and in a main clause showing an attitude of submission to fate le-om duce "we would bear".

De-o fi una, de-o fi alta... Ce e scris și pentru noi,
Bucuroși le-om duce toate, de e pace, de-i război.

Be it one, be it the other... Whatever fate we have,
We will gladly go through all, be it peace or be it war

In Hindi, the presumptive mood can be used in all the three tenses. The same structure for a particular grammatical aspect can be used to refer to the present, past and future times depending on the context. The table below shows the conjugations for the presumptive mood copula in Hindi and Romanian with some exemplar usage on the right:

Presumptive Mood Conjugations
Person		Singular			Plural		
Person		1st	2nd	3rd	1st	2nd	3rd
Romanian		oi		o	om	oți	or
Hindi	♂	hūṁgā	hogā		hoṁgē	hogē	hoṁgē
Hindi	♀	hūṁgī	hogī		hoṁgī	hogī	hoṁgī

	Tense		Sentence	Translation
Romanian	Present		tu oi face	You might do.
Romanian	Past		tu oi fi făcut	You must/might have done.
Romanian	Progressive		tu oi fi făcând	You must/might be doing.
	Aspect	Tense	Sentence	Translation
Hindi	Habitual	Present	tū kartā hoga abhī	You must/might be doing it now.
Hindi	Habitual	Past	tū kartā hogā pêhlē.	You must/might have done it before (habitually in the past).
Hindi	Perfective	Present	tūnē kiyā hogā abhī.	You must/might have done now.
Hindi	Perfective	Past	tūnē kiyā hogā pêhlē.	You must/might have done it before (in the past).
Hindi	Progressive	Present	tū kar rahā hogā abhī	You must/might be doing it now.
Hindi	Progressive	Past	tū kar rahā hogā do din pêhlē	You must/might have been doing it two days ago.
Hindi	Progressive	Future	tū kar rahā hogā do din bād	You must/might be doing it two days from now.

Note:

1. The translations are just the closest possible English approximations and not exact.
2. Only masculine conjugations are shown for Hindi.

=== Hortative ===
The hortative or hortatory mood is used to express plea, insistence, imploring, self-encouragement, wish, desire, intent, command, purpose or consequence. It does not exist in English, but phrases such as "let us" are often used to denote it. In Latin, it is interchangeable with the jussive.

=== Inferential ===
The inferential mood (abbreviated infer or infr) is used to report a nonwitnessed event without confirming it, but the same forms also function as admiratives in the Balkan languages in which they occur. The inferential mood is used in some languages such as Turkish to convey information about events that were not directly observed or were inferred by the speaker. When referring to Bulgarian and other Balkan languages, it is often called renarrative mood; when referring to Estonian, it is called oblique mood. The inferential is usually impossible to distinguish when translated into English. For instance, indicative Bulgarian той отиде (toy otide) and Turkish o gitti translates the same as inferential той отишъл (toy otishal) and o gitmiş — with the English indicative he went. Using the first pair, however, implies very strongly that the speaker either witnessed the event or is very sure that it took place. The second pair implies either that the speaker did not in fact witness it taking place, that it occurred in the remote past, or that there is considerable doubt as to whether it actually happened. If it were necessary to make the distinction, then the English constructions "he must have gone" or "he is said to have gone" would partly translate the inferential.

== Sources ==
- Huddleston, Rodney D.; Pullum, Geoffrey K., eds. (2002). The Cambridge grammar of the English language. Cambridge: Cambridge University Press. ISBN 0-521-43146-8.
