= Myska =

Constructed language based on Chibcha

- Created by: Facundo Saravia
- Purpose: Constructed language: Myska
- Sources: Chibcha

Language codes
- ISO 639-3: None (mis)
- Glottolog: None

The Myska language is a constructed language based on colonial Chibcha, created by the Argentine Facundo Saravia. The pronunciation is based on the phonological proposal by María González for Chibcha, although it has several innovations. Its spelling is also based on the Aproximación al sistema fonético-fonológico de la lengua muisca and a free adaptation of the spelling of Fray Bernardo de Lugo.

This language has received several criticisms from the Chibcha cabildos and sectors of academia.

== Phonology and alphabet ==
Saravia's son speaking Myska.

Myska has around 20 phonemes. The letters are pronounced more or less as follows:

Phoneme	Letter	Pronunciation
/i/	i	open "i" as in "'inca" – sié – "water" or "river"
/ɨ/	y	between "i" and "e"; "a" in action – ty – "singing"
/u/	u	"ou" as in "you" – uba – "face"
/e/	e	as in "action"; izhe – "street"
/o/	o	short "o" as in "box" – to – "dog"
/a/	a	as in Spanish "casa"; ka – "enclosure" or "fence"
/p/	p	"p" as in "people" – paba – "father"; before "y" it is pronounced [pw] as in Spanish "puente" – pyky – "heart"
/t/	t	"t" as in "text" – yta – "hand"
/k/	k	"c" as in "cold" – kony – "wheel"
/b~β/	b	as in "bed", or as in Spanish "haba"; – bohozhá – "with"; between the vowels "y" it is pronounced [βw] – kyby – "to sleep"
/g~ɣ/	g	"gh" as in "good", or as in Spanish "abogado"; – gata – "fire"
/ɸ/	f	between a "b" and "w" using both lips without producing sound, a short whistle – foï – "mantle"; before a "y" it is pronounced [ɸw] – fyzha – "everything"
/s/	s	"s" as in "sorry" – sahawá – "husband"; before "i" changes a little to "sh"; [ʃ] – sié – "water" or "river"
/ʂ/	ch	"sh" as in "shine", but with the tongue pushed backwards – chuta – "son" or "daughter"
/h/	h	as in "hello" – huïá – "inwards"
/tʂ/	zh	as in "chorizo", but with the tongue to the back – zhysky – "head"
/m/	m	"m" as in "man" – mika – "three"; before "y" it is pronounced [mw], as in "Muisca" – myska – "person" or "people"; in first position before a consonant it is pronounced [im] – mpkwaká – "thanks to"
/n/	n	"n" as in "nice" – nyky – "brother" or "sister"; in first position followed by a consonant it's pronounced [in] – ngá – "and"
/w/	w	"w" as in "wow!" – we – "house"
/j/	ï	"i-e" as in Beelzebub – ïe – "road" or "prayer"

Myska did not have a lateral phoneme.

In case of repetition of the same vowel, the word can be shortened: fuhuchá ~ fuchá – "woman".

In Chibcha, words are made of combinations where sometimes vowels are in front of the word. When this happens in front of another vowel, the vowel changes as follows:

- a-uba becomes oba – "his (or her, its) face"
- a-ita becomes eta – "his base"
- a-yta becomes ata – "his hand" (note: ata also means "one")

Sometimes this combination is not performed and the words are written with the prefix plus the new vowel: a-ita would become eta but can be written as aeta, a-uba as aoba and a-yta as ayta

== Structure and grammar ==
=== Noun ===
Nouns in Chibcha do not have genders or plurals. to thus can mean "male dog", "male dogs", "female dog" or "female dogs". To solve this, the Myska used the numbers and the word for "man", cha, and "woman", fuhuchá, to specify gender and plural:

- to cha ata – "one male dog" (literally: "dog" "male" "one")
- to cha mika – "three male dogs" ("dog male three")
- to fuhuchá myhyká – "four female dogs"

=== Personal pronoun ===
Myska	English
hycha	I
mwe	thou / you (singular) – informal and formal use
asy	he / she / it / they
chié	we
mié	you (plural)

=== Possessive pronoun ===
The possessive pronoun is prefixed to its object.

Myska	English
zhy- / i-	my
um-	your
a-	his / her / its / their
chi-	our
mi-	your (plural)

- i- is only used in combination with ch, n, s, t or zh; i-to = ito ("my dog")
- zh- becomes zhy- when followed by a consonant (except ï); zh-paba = zhypaba ("my father")
- in case of a ï, the letter is lost: zh-ïohozhá = zhohozhá ("my buttocks")
- m- becomes um- when followed by a consonant; m-ïoky = umïoky ("your book")
- zhy- and um- are shortened when the word starts with w; zhy-waïá & um-waïá = zhwaïá & mwaïá ("my mother" and "your mother")
- when the word starts with h, zhy- and um- are shortened and the vowel following h repeated; zhy-hué & um-hué = zhuhué & muhué ("my sir" and "your sir")

=== Verbs ===
The Myska uses two types of verbs, ending on -skwá and -suká; bkyskwá ("to do") and guitysuká ("to whip") which have different forms in their grammatical conjugations. bkyskwá is shown below, for verbs ending on -suká.

==== Conjugations ====
Myska	English
kyka	to do

===== Present tense or imperfect =====
Myska	English
zhybkyskwá	I do or did
umbkyskwá	you (singular) do or did
abkyskwá	he / she / it does or did
chibkyskwá	we do/did
mibkyskwá	you do/did
abkyskwá	they do/did

===== Perfect and pluperfect =====
Myska	English
zhybky	I did or have done
umbky	you (singular) did or " "
abky	he / she / it did or has done
chibky	we did or have done
mibky	you did or " "
abky	they did or " "

===== Future tense =====
Myska	English
zhybkyngá	I shall do
umbkyngá	you will do
abkyngá	he / she / it " "
chibkyngá	we shall do
mibkyngá	you will do
abkyngá	they " "

===== Imperatives =====
Myska	English
kyû	do (singular)
kyuua	do (plural)

===== Volitive modality =====
Myska	English
chakyia	may I do
makyia	may you do
kyia	may he / she / it do
chikyia	may we do
mikyia	may you do
kyia	may they do

== Criticism ==
=== Chibcha town councils ===
This constructed language has raised several concerns on the part of the Chibcha groups recognized by the Colombian State due to accusations of cultural appropriation and for displaying itself as a living native language despite the fact that the Chibchas lost their language perhaps since the 18th century, so that there are no native speakers today. Another concern of the Chibcha councils is the commercialization of their linguistic heritage through courses or talks at public events, schools, squares and other places, whose members present themselves as legitimate representatives of the current Chibchas, or as their direct descendants. With these and other activities they raise money, including from national institutions and international organizations on behalf of the Chibcha and their revitalization, using the constructed language as an instrument to demonstrate their progress and legitimacy. On the other hand, the use of Mysca in social networks and public events has generated the feeling that Chibcha has been a language that has survived uninterruptedly since pre-Hispanic times, ignoring the historical process of acculturation and the ancestral struggle of the cabildos for the communal ownership of their lands, for the recognition of their identity by the State and against the exclusion and poverty to which the members and ancestors of the Chibcha cabildos have been subject.

=== Academia ===
The neo-language has also been involved in different academic controversies because on many occasions Myska is presented to the public as a natural language or, in the best of cases, as the closest approximation to the language spoken by the Chibchas, despite that its phonology, spelling, grammar, and even vocabulary, have not developed naturally but rather based on ancient writings, which is why its consistency and distance from the spelling of known linguistic sources is questioned. The presentation of this reconstructed language as an almost faithful approximation to the original or equivalent to the colony's Chibcha has aroused the following criticism:

- The creation of alternative vocabularies and grammars to the colonial sources distances the unsuspecting public from the true colonial linguistic sources, the main source of Chibcha.
- It is a personalist proposal that does not allow criticism and from which other positions have been denigrated.
- The new spelling reveals an obvious contradiction, how can a spelling be created if it cannot be contrasted or verified with native speakers or audio records that support it.
- One of the biggest controversies is the prosody of the language. Academics such as Diego Gómez have stated that the pronunciation of several Myska words do not correspond in almost any case to the reconstructions carried out by him and his team based on the comparative method. Furthermore, the muisquisms, words of Chibcha origin that were adapted to the Spanish of the area, are reinterpreted and pronounced differently than they have been traditionally pronounced. For example, the Muisquism 'cuba' (youngest son), is written kuhubá and pronounced [kuhu'baa], even though the inhabitants of Cundinamarca and Boyacá have traditionally pronounced it ['kuba].
- The use of this artificial language is part of a political agenda that seeks to highlight the relationship between oppressor and oppressed, although its disseminators are mostly privileged white-mestizo people with a high level of education, who have undertaken a process of re-ethnicization, ignoring the traditional authorities and organizations of the indigenous cabildos recognized by the Colombian State.

== Sources ==
- González de Pérez, María Stella (2006). Aproximación al sistema fonético-fonológico de la lengua muisca (in Spanish). Bogotá Instituto Caro y Cuervo. pp. 53–119.
- Saravia, Facundo Manuel (2015). Curso de aproximación a la lengua chibcha o muisca - Nivel 1 [Introduction course to the Chibcha or Muisca language - Level 1] (PDF) (in Spanish). Fundación Zaquenzipa. pp. 1–81.
