= Ancient Greek present progressive markers =

Ancient Greek verbs often alter the stem in the present (progressive) system with a variety of markers. These markers are best understood as markers of the continuous and progressive aspects, rather than of the present tense.

For verbs with progressive markers, the present progressive system is not the best guide to the true stem, which is often more clearly manifested in the aorist or future tense forms. Note that none of these markers was productive in the Classical period, although many verbs had alternate forms with and without the markers even into the Hellenistic period and later. Many of these markers date back to Proto-Indo-European and have clear parallels in other Indo-European languages. However, some Ancient Greek grammars and textbooks list and discuss these markers to help students grappling with the confusing morphology of Ancient Greek verbs.

== *y yod marker ==
Ancient Greek has no consonant that makes the Y sound, similar to the Latin consonantal I in words like iudex (judge), ianus (door) iugum (yoke), but it was part of Indo-European phonology, and it left detectable marks. The *y progressive marker has several manifestations, of which this chart is an incomplete overview:

Dentals (τ,δ,θ)	+ y =	ζ
Velar/Palatals (κ,γ,χ)	+ y =	ττ- /σσ-
Lambda (liquid)( λ)	+ y =	λλ-
Labials (β,π,φ,ψ)	+ y =	πτ-
ν	+ y =	ιν (I is added to stem vowel)
ρ	+ y =	ιρ (I is added to stem vowel)

stem	marker	progressive	aorist
θαυματ- (wonder)	y	θαυμάζω	ἐθαύμασα
ἐλπίδ- (hope)	y	ἐλπίζω	ἤλπισα
ἅλ- (jump )	y	ἅλλομαι	ἡλόμην
πραγ- (make)	y	πράσσω/ πράττω	ἔπρᾱξα
ταραχ- (disturb)	y	ταράσσω/ ταράττω	ἐτάραξα
ταγ- (arrange)	y	τάσσω/ τάττω	ἔταξα
τεν- (stretch)	y	τείνω	τενῶ (future)
χαρ- (rejoice)	y	χαίρω	ἐχάρην
βλαβ- (hurt)	y	βλάπτω	ἔβλαβον
καλυβ- (cover)	y	καλύπτω	ἐκάλυψα
κλεπ- (steal)	y	κλέπτω	ἔκλεψα
σκεπ- (look, spy)	y	σκέπτομαι	ἐσκεψάμην
ἅφ- (touch)	y	ἅπτω	ἧψα
θαφ- (bury)	y	θάπτω	ἔθαψα

"The I Class", p. 201-227 sections 292-330 in Curtius, Georg. The Greek Verb: Its Structure and Development. Translated by Augustus S Wilkins and E. B England. London: J. Murray, 1880.

== ΣΚ inchoative marker ==
This marker appears to be an Indo-European root for beginning an action, changing into a condition, an inchoative marker.

stem	marker	progressive	aorist
πάθ- (suffer)	σκ	πάσχω	ἔπαθον
εὑρ- (find)	σκ	εὑρίσκω	ηὗρον
δά- (teach)	σκ	διδάσκω (also reduplicated)	ἐδίδαξα
θαν- (die)	σκ	θνῄσκω	ἔθανον
μνα- (remind)	σκ	μῐμνήσκω	ἔμνησα

Compare Latin verbs with similar inchoative SC markers

- nosco " get to know" from gno-sco (perfect : novi)
- cresco "grow" from cre – sco (perfect: crevi)
- dormisco "fall asleep" obdormisco "go to sleep"
- duresco, "become hard"
- vesperasco "become evening"
- proficiscor, proficiscī, profectus sum "set out"
- rubescō, rubescere, rubuī "grow red, redden"

== Ν nu marker ==
Ancient Greek often adds an N in the progressive forms of verbs. So often, in fact, that the most common verbs have N added twice into the stem.

Note that a N in Ancient Greek often expands to αν (as in alpha privatives anarchy, anorexia, anesthetic)

stem/root	marker	progressive	aorist
ταμ- (cut)	ν	τέμνω	ἔταμον
αἰσθ- (perceive)	ν	αἰσθάνομαι	ᾐσθόμην
δακ- (bite)	ν	δάκνω	ἔδακον
ἱκ- (arrive)	ν	ἱκνέομαι,	ἱκόμην
κυ- (kiss)	ν	κυνέω	ἔκυσα
αὐξ- (grow)	ν	αὐξάνω	ηὖξον

stem/root	marker	progressive	aorist
λαβ- (take)	2ν	λαμβάνω	ἔλαβον
λαθ- (hide)	2ν	λανθάνω	ἔλαθον
μαθ- (learn)	2ν	μανθάνω	ἔμαθον
τυχ- (happen)	2ν	τυγχάνω	ἔτυχον
πυθ- (hear)	2ν	πυνθάνομαι	ἐπυθόμην
λαχ- (get by lot)	2ν	λαγχάνω	ἔλαχον

See "The Nasal Class", p.169-186 sections 246-269 in Curtius, Georg. The Greek Verb: Its Structure and Development. Translated by Augustus S Wilkins and E. B England. London: J. Murray, 1880.

"Verben auf ω, deren reiner Stamm im Praes. und Impf. durch Einfuegung eines ν ... verstaerkt ist" in Kühner, Raphael. Ausführliche Grammatik Der Griechischen Sprache. Edited by Friedrich Blass and Bernhard Gerth. 3. Aufl. ed. Hannover: Hahnsche Buchhandlung, 1890, vol 1 part 2, p. 173

== Ε epsilon progressive marker ==
Ancient Greek progressive forms will sometimes add an E into the vowel of the root. The first four verbs in the following list lengthen the vowel with an epsilon in progressive forms.

In an unrelated phenomenon, Ancient Greek will sometimes add an epsilon at the end of the root in the progressive forms. Many verbs have two progressive forms in Homer and other poets, one with and without the added epsilon, such as κυρέω and κύρω, ξύρω and ξυρέω, αἰδέομαι and αἴδομαι.

stem/root	marker	progressive	aorist
λιπ- (leave)	ε	λείπω	ἔλιπον
φυγ- (flee)	ε	φεύγω	ἔφυγον
πιθ- (persuade)	ε	πείθω	ἔπιθον
στιχ- (step)	ε	στείχω	ἔστιχον
δοκ- (seem, think)	ε	δοκέω	ἔδοξα
γαμ- (marry)	ε	γαμέω	ἔγημα

"Stems Which Lengthen the Vowel in the Present", p. 150-159, sections 219-232 in Curtius, Georg. The Greek Verb: Its Structure and Development. Translated by Augustus S Wilkins and E. B England. London: J. Murray, 1880.

"The E-Class and the Related Formations", p. 258-274, sections 376-398 in Curtius, Georg. The Greek Verb: Its Structure and Development. Translated by Augustus S Wilkins and E. B England. London: J. Murray, 1880.

„Verben, deren reinem Stamme im Praes. und Impf. ε zugefügt ist", p. 179 section 273 in Kühner, Raphael. Ausführliche Grammatik Der Griechischen Sprache. Edited by Friedrich Blass and Bernhard Gerth. 3. Aufl. ed. Hannover: Hahnsche Buchhandlung, 1890, vol 1 part 2, p. 179

== Τ tau progressive marker ==
Some Ancient Greek verbs have a tau added to the root in the progressive tenses. Most of these are best understood as a reflex of roots ending in a labial plus the yod/iota progressive marker.

stem/root	marker	progressive	aorist
βλαβ- (hurt)	y	βλάπτω	ἔβλαβον
καλυβ- (cover)	y	καλύπτω	ἐκάλυψα
κλεπ- (steal)	y	κλέπτω	ἔκλεψα
σκεπ- (look, spy)	y	σκέπτομαι	ἐσκεψάμην
ἅφ- (touch)	y	ἅπτω	ἧψα
θαφ- (bury)	y	θάπτω	ἔθαψα

- Sihler, Andrew L. (1995) New Comparative Grammar of Greek and Latin, Oxford, New York: Oxford University Press p. 515, section 465.1
- Obsolete: "The T-Class", p. 160-168, sections 233-245 in Curtius, Georg. The Greek Verb: Its Structure and Development. Translated by Augustus S Wilkins and E. B England. London: J. Murray, 1880.

== Reduplication ==
Reduplication is a hallmark of the perfect aspect system in both Latin and Ancient Greek, but some Ancient Greek verbs reduplicate the root in the progressive tenses. Reduplication can cause a lot of sound changes, including loss of aspiration, or loss of a vowel (γεν into γν in the case of γίγνομαι).

stem/root	marker	progressive	aorist
δρα- (run)	δι	διδράσκω	ἀπέδραν
δυ- (get into)	δι	ἀποδιδύσκω	ἔδυσα
γνω- (know)	γι	γιγνώσκω	ἔγνων
γεν- (become)	γι	γίγνομαι	ἐγενόμην
βρω- (eat)	βι	βιβρώσκω	ἔβρων
τειν- (stretch)	τι	τιταίνω	ἐτεινάμην
δά- (teach)	δι	διδάσκω (also with σκ marker)	ἐδίδαξα
μνα- (remind)	μι	μιμνήσκω	ἔμνησα

== Sources ==
- Curtius, Georg. The Greek Verb: Its Structure and Development. Translated by Augustus S Wilkins and E. B England. London: J. Murray, 1880, p. 136.
- Kühner, Raphael. Ausführliche Grammatik Der Griechischen Sprache. Edited by Friedrich Blass and Bernhard Gerth. 3. Aufl. ed. Hannover: Hahnsche Buchhandlung, 1890, vol 1 part 2, p. 176
