= Cahuilla grammar =

Grammatical features of Cahuilla

The grammar of Cahuilla is agglutinative, head-marking, and makes extensive use of compounding, and derivation. That is, it can add many different prefixes and suffixes to a root until very long words are formed that sum up a whole sentence.

== Demonstratives ==
Cahuilla uses a single demonstrative ’i’ ("this/that") that takes the form ’i before sonorants and ’i’ elsewhere.

It can be modified with deictic markers meaning local or distant/remote.

| | Proximal | | Distal | |
| | simple | complex | simple | complex |
|---|---|---|---|---|
| sing. subj. | ’et | ’evat | pe’ | pevat |
| sing. obj. | ’eti | ’evati | pe’i | pevati |
| plur. subj. | ’etem | ’evatem | pe’em | pevatem |
| plur. obj. | ’etmi | ’evatmi | pe’mi | pevatmi |

The complex and simple forms have no difference in perceived meaning according to Seiler. The inflection agrees with the sentence itself where the deictic marker co-ordinates with the subject or verb such as in "’i’ pe’ menill" meaning "this over there, the moon," as pe’ is inflected to mark the singular subject menill. Additionally, there are clitic forms of this marker: pe, pee and pey.

== Nouns ==
=== Nominal predicate subject-marking prefixes ===
Nominal predicates (e.g. 'I am a person') mark their subjects ('I' in the preceding example) by adding a prefix. Nouns bearing subject prefixes can serve as predicates (i.e. 'to be an X') without a copula. (Note: As nouns cannot inflect for tense-aspect-mood like verbs do, the copula qal 'to be' is required for nominal predication outside of the present tense, in which case both the noun and the copula bear subject prefixes.) Both nominal and verbal predicates distinguish two numbers: singular and plural, and the number of a subject prefix must match that of its predicate.

Nominal predicates may or may not be preceded by the independent pronouns (in parentheses in the table below).

| Person | Nominal subject prefixes | Example |
|---|---|---|
| 1S | (ne') hen- | (ne') hentaxliswet 'I am a human being' |
| 2S | ('e') ’et- | ('e') ’ettaxliswet 'you are a human being' |
| 3S | (pe') ø | (pe') taxliswet 'he is a woman being' |
| 1P | (chemem) hish- | (chemem) hishtaxliswetem 'we are human beings' |
| 2P | ('emem) ’eme- | ('emem) ’emetaxliswetem 'you guys are human beings' |
| 3P | (pe'em) ø | (pe'em) taxliswetem 'they are human beings' |

=== Absolutive and construct states ===
Like all other Uto-Aztecan languages, Cahuilla nouns usually appear in what is called the absolutive state (also called non-possessed noun state), that is to say an absolutive ending -t, -sh, -l or -ll is added to the bare noun root. If the noun is possessed however (if it's preceded by a possessive prefix or if it's the possessed noun of a compound), these absolutive endings are dropped and the noun appears in what is called the construct state.

The absolutive suffix is absent when the noun is incorporated into a compound of which it is not the head.

=== Number and plural ===
Like all modern Uto-Aztecan languages (except Tübatulabal), Cahuilla nouns only know the singular and plural numbers.

==== Plural formation in -em ====
Most Cahuilla nouns are made plural by adding the ending -em:

- wikikmall "bird" → wikikmallem "birds"
- taxliswet "person" → taxliswetem "people"

As seen in the Morphophonology section, the final -sh of some nouns becomes -ch- between two vowels. This is what usually happens to -sh ending nouns when the plural ending -em is added:

- ting'ayvash "doctor" → ting'ayvachem "doctors"
- tekish "cave" → tekichem "caves"

Nouns ending with the -l absolutive ending double the l in the plural before -em:

- ’eqwasmal "boy" → ’qwashmallem "boys"

==== Plural formation in -am with vowel loss ====
Some nouns do not follow the -em plural formation pattern but take the plural ending -am and loose the last vowel of their root:

- palukul "snake" → paluklam "snakes"
- hunal "badger" → hunlam "badgers"

Many (but not all) of these nouns have the vowel u in their root: palukul, hunal, tukat etc. A few nouns whose bare root is ending in -sh and that take an absolutive ending -ill make their plural by loosing the -i-:

- machill "tick" → mashllam "ticks"

A few nouns with either double vowel or a diphthong loose the second vowel and replace it by a h while adding -am:

- neat "basket" → nehtam "baskets"
- muut "owl" → muhtam "owls"
- meet "gopher" → mehtam "gophers"

==== Plural formation through consonant reduplication ====
Reduplication is a plural formation way also found in many other Uto-Aztecan languages. Many nouns referring to human beings, family relatives or living beings show traces of reduplication in their plural formation:

- nawishmal "girl" → nanwishmallem "girls"

Here the first consonant n- reduplicates after the first vowel, and the -em ending is added. Reduplication may also occur with the so-called glottal stop ’, as in ’awal "dog" → ’a’walem "dogs". The noun naxanish, "a man" follows this pattern, but the reduplication of -n- before -x- triggered the palatization of -n- into -ng-:

- naxanish "man" → nangxanichem "men"

to this category belongs also the noun ñichill "woman", even though it shows a -ch-/-k- phonological adaptation:

- ñichill "woman" → ñingkichem "women"

The noun kiat shows a full reduplication of the first syllable and the -am plural ending:

- kiat "child, baby" → kikitam "children, babies"

A few nouns, usually referring to inanimate objects, make their plural through first consonant reduplication but without any -em or -am ending:

- qawish "rock, mountain" → qaqwish "rocks, mountains"
- ’elat "dress" → ’e’lat "dresses"

==== Plural formation for Spanish borrowings ====
Words borrowed from Spanish often end in -a’ or -u’. Most of them form their plural by reduplicating this final vowel before the plural-marking -m:

- gaatu’ "cat" → gaatu’um "cats"
- kaama’ "bed" → kaama’am "beds"
- liivru’ "book" → liivru’um "books"

A few of them, however, form their plural by loosing the ’ and adding -m:

- vuuru’ "burro, donkey" → vuurum "burros, donkeys"
- ’eveexa’ "bee" → ’eveexam "bees"

To this last category belong the words kampaan "bell" (plural: kampaanem), mansaana’ "apple" and vureewa’ "sheep".

==== Irregular plural formations ====
A few nouns do not enter in the aforementioned patterns and form their plural by modifying their roots:

- ’isill "coyote" → ’istam "coyotes"
- sasang "wild bee" → sasañem "wild bees"

A few other nouns do not change in the plural:

- kish "house" → kish "house"
- tamit "sun, day" → tamit "suns, days"
- pit "road" → pit "roads"
- kelawat "tree" → kelawat "trees, forest"
- sawish "bread" → sawish "breads"

=== Declensions ===
Cahuilla nouns take different forms whether they are the subject of the clause or it's object. When Cahuilla nouns are the object of the verb, they take the ending -i.

- Naxanish liivru’i leyeerqa = A man is reading the book

Nouns that end in a vowel take an -y instead of -i:

- Ne’elay peteewqa’ = He saw my dress

When it is added to a proper noun, the -i is preceded by an hyphen.

- René Girard-i pe’leyeerqa = You are reading René Girard

=== Possessive prefixes ===
Possession is usually indicated in Cahuilla by possessive prefixes. The possessed noun must appear in the construct state (without the absolutive endings -t, -sh, -l and -ll) and is preceded by the person possessive prefixes ne-, ’e-, he-, chem-, ’em- and hem-. Only singular nouns can be given in the possessed form. If they want to mean that they possess a plural noun, Cahuilla speakers use the same form as the singular (nesaw means "my bread" as well as "my breads"). Here are a few exceptions :

- the 3rd person singular prefix he- is only attached to monosyllabic nouns. For longer nouns, no prefix is added and one only knows the noun is possessed because of its construct state (so that taxmu'a must mean his song because a song or the song would be the absolutive form taxmu'at).
- a few words, usually Spanish borrowings (but not only, and not all Spanish-borrowed words) also take a possessive suffix -ki:
  - weevu’ → chemweevu’ki, "our egg(s)"
  - mansaana’ → ’emansaana’ki, "your apple(s)"
- nouns referring to animals use the word ’achill (construct state ’ash) "animal" to make their possessive forms, so that cannot say *ne'aw, "my dog" (from ’awal) but has to use the word ’ash followed (or preceded, the order is free) by the word for dog, ’awal :
  - ’awal → ne’ash awal or ’awal ne’ash, "my dog"
  - gaatu’ → he’ash gaatu’ or gaatu’ he’ash, "his cat"
- the word qichill (construct state qish) "money" is irregular, it takes a suffixe -ki'a in addition to the aforementioned prefixes:
  - qichill → neqishki’a, "my money"

| Person | Marker | kish, short noun | taxmu'at, long noun | liivru’, Spanish-borrowed noun | ’awal, animal noun |
|---|---|---|---|---|---|
| 1S | ne- | neki’ 'my house' | netaxmu’a 'my song' | neliivru’ki 'my book' | ne’ash ’awal 'my dog' |
| 2S | 'e- | ’eki’ 'your house' | ’etaxmu’a 'your song' | ’eliivru’ki 'your book' | ’e’ash ’awal 'your dog' |
| 3S | he- (for monosyllabic nouns) Ø- (for longer nouns) | heki’ 'his house' | _taxmu'a '(his) song' | _liivru’ki 'his book' | he’ash ’awal 'your dog' |
| 1P | chem- | chemki’ 'our house' | chemtaxmu’a 'our song' | chemliivru’ki 'our book' | chem’ash ’awal 'our dog' |
| 2P | 'em- | ’emki’ 'your house' | ’emtaxmu’a 'your song' | ’emliivru’ki 'your book' | ’em’ash ’awal 'your dog' |
| 3P | hem- | hemki’ 'their house' | hemtaxmu’a 'their song' | hemliivru’ 'their book' | hem’ash ’awal 'their dog' |

== Nominalizers ==
Nominalization, or the creation of nouns from verbs and adverbs as is the case in Cahuilla, occurs fairly frequently. Grammatically, these so-called nominalizers created nominal forms from verbs or adverbs, they can be translated in English either by a verbial clause or by a noun, depending on the case.

=== Verbial nominalizers ===
Seiler lists ten nominalizers attached to the verb playing a wide range of functions.

-ka(t) 'inceptive'
Using Seiler's terminology, this nominalizer indicates an oriented relationship in the noun/action, very similar to the nominal suffix -ka(t) (see below). As tense plays little role in the language, this should not be taken to mean 'future.'

me– hish– qwá' –kat –em
O- P2- STEM -SUFF -SUFF
3SG 1PL eat NOM PL
them we eat lit. 'We are one who are going to eat them.';
'We are going to eat them.'

’eme– chem– kí’iw –wen .. ’eme– hish– wáykini –kat –em
O- P1- STEM -SUFF .. O- P2- STEM -SUFF -SUFF
2PL 1PL wait DUR .. 2PL 1PL feed NOM PL
you we wait .. you we feed
'We are waiting for you so that we may be going to feed you.'

-(a)k(t) 'excellence'
This denotes goodness or excellence.

(’e’) .. ’et– mú –ak
PRON .. P2- STEM -SUFF
2SG .. 2SG shoot NOM
you .. you shoot excelling
'You are a good shooter.'

(ne’) .. hen– néh –ak
PRON .. P2- STEM -SUFF
1SG .. 1SG {weave baskets} NOM
I .. I {weave baskets} excelling
'I am a good basket weaver.'

-nax(t) 'supposed to fulfill function'
This denotes where one is supposed to fulfill a specialized function, notably in a socio-cultural context.

pe– y– píi’ –nax
O- P2- STEM -SUFF
3SG 3SG bewitch NOM
'the one supposed to bewitch him.'

táxmu’ –nax
sing NOM
'one who is supposed to sing'

-(i)sh 'completed action or process'
Denotes a completed action or being completed as a process.

támit –i .. pi– y– téw –ish
STEM -SUFF .. O- P2- STEM -SUFF
sun OBL .. 3SG 3SG find NOM
'the one that found the sun'

v-vash 'performing in a special situation'
Denotes performing an act in a specially defined situation. Compare the following examples:

pe– n– páy –ni –qal
O- P1- STEM -SUFF -SUFF
3SG 1SG daylight CAUS DUR
'I'm making it daylight' i.e., 'I'm sitting up all night.'

pe– y– páy –ni –vash
O- P2- STEM -SUFF -SUFF
3SG 3SG daylight CAUS NOM
'the one that makes it daylight' i.e., 'the morning star'

-wet/-et 'habitual or competent performer'
Functioning similarly to -vaš, denotes a competent or habitual performer. When in combination with the durative (dur, -qal/'-wen) or stative (stat, -wen), it takes the form -et. Compare the following examples:

nú’in –qal –et
STEM -SUFF -SUFF
tell DUR NOM
'the one that tells (people) what to do,' 'leader'

nu’in –wen –et –em
STEM -SUFF -SUFF -SUFF
tell DUR NOM PL
'the ones that tell (people) what to do,' leaders'

tax– Ø– nú’in –qal
O- P1- STEM -SUFF
INDEF 3SG tell DUR
'He tells [indef.] what to do.'

tax– Ø– nú’in –qal –et –em
O- P1- STEM -SUFF -SUFF -SUFF
INDEF 3SG tell DUR NOM PL
'Leaders'

híchi –wet
go NOM
'one that habitually goes.'

-’a & -at/-(’)ill 'abstract nominalizers'
These makes abstract verbs into nouns. Where -at and -ill/-’ill can attach to abstract verbs with few restrictions, -’a is restricted to abstract verbs which are then possessed once nominalized.

’ámin –at
throw NOM
'the throwing,' 'the orphan'

ne– ’ámin –’a
1SG throw NOM
'my throwing'

qwá’isni –’ill
write NOM
'the writing'

ne– qwáisni –’a
1SG write NOM
'my writing'

-pish 'unrealized subordination'
Nominalizes verbs that both indicates subordination and something that has not yet happened.

vúvan– pish
hit NOM
'an insect that stings'

-vel/-ve 'event already occurring or occurred'
Nominalizes verbs in regard to occurrence of the action.

kúp –vel
sleep NOM
'the bed'

ne– kúp –ve
1SG sleep NOM
'my bed'

-va’al 'located event'
A complex of suffixes where the verbal suffix -va’ indicates 'locale, place' such as:

pa .. hem–Ø– chengen –va’
there .. 3PL dance place
'Where they are dancing.'

Combining with -al, the abstract nominalizer, there become forms such as:

pís– iva’ –al
{go out} place NOM
'the place to go out,' 'toilet'

Ø– hem– pís– iva’ –a
3rd 3PL {go out} place NOM
'their toilet'

=== Adverbial nominalizers ===
There is only one adverbial nominalizer according to Seiler's Grammar, which is -vish. It can either affix to adverbs to denote being from a place or time or denote ordering.

Place/Time

kíchan– xwan –vish –em
SOUTH‍ 'toward' NOM PL
'ones who are from the South.'

Place/Time

váani– –nga –x –vish –em
{Banning (place name)} LOC ABL NOM PL
'ones who are from Banning.'

Ordering

múluk(u) –vish
first NOM
'one who is first.'

== Pronouns ==
=== Independent personal pronouns ===
Because Cahuilla is an agglutinative language, verbs usually bear person-marking prefixes. In sentences where English a copula verb, Cahuilla also uses another series of person-marking prefixes. These prefixes make independent pronouns far rarer in Cahuilla than in an analytic language like English.

- I cook → Nekukulqa
- I am a brave man → Hentaxat

3rd person independent pronouns do not exist and are replaced by the demonstratives ’i’, ’evat, ’et etc. seen above.

Independent pronouns in Cahuilla may be used for emphasis:

- It's me that's cooking → Ne’ nekukulqa

Independent pronouns can be used to emphasize not only the subject of the sentence but any component of it:

- It's your house that they are destroying → ’E’ ’ekiy pemsakwaywe

Independent pronouns are also used before and after conjunctions like pen ("and"):

- You and I will meet him → ’E’ pen ne’ haxpichemmaqine

Notice that you and I equals we, so that the verb takes the 1st person plural subject prefix chem-.

Independent personal pronouns
| | | Singular | | Plural | |
| | | Accented | Clitic | Accented | Clitic |
|---|---|---|---|---|---|
| 1st | subj. | ne' | ne' | chemem čém | chem |
| 1st | obj. | ne'iy | | chememi | |
| 2nd | subj. | 'e' | 'e | 'emem 'em | 'em |
| 2nd | obj. | 'e'iy | | 'ememi | |

== Verbs ==
Verbs in Cahuilla are bare roots that always appear with affixes. The Cahuilla verb for "to sleep", for example, is the bare root -kup- that never can appear without prefixes or suffixes, so that *kup alone is not a Cahuilla word. That is why all Cahuilla verbs are given enclosed in dashes on Wiktionary:
-kup-.

=== Transitive and intransitive verbs ===
Cahuilla verbs can be divided into two categories based on the subject-marking prefixes they will take: intransitive verbs only take subject-marking prefixes on their bare roots, whereas transitive verbs cannot appear without both subject and object-marking prefixes. Even if the object of a transitive verb is given in a sentence, the verb will take an object-marking prefix that kind of repeats it :

- Wikikma’lli **pe**nteewqa’ = I saw a bird

In this example, even though the object of the verb -teew- is wikikma'lli, "the bird", the verb -teew- has to bear the 3rd person prefix pe- referring to wikikma'lli.

==== Subject-marking prefixes ====
The table below shows the subject-marking prefixes for both intransitive and transitive verbs. As transitive verbs must also have an object-marking prefix with them, we gave it in the 3rd singular neutral pe-, corresponding to English it. As you will see in the Subject and object prefix combination section below, subject and object-marking prefixes create fixed prefix combination special to transitive verbs.

| Person | Intransitive subject prefixes | Example | Transitive subject prefixes (Note: Transitive verbs must always appear with an object, they cannot appear with only a subject. To show the subject prefixes, we had to give them in combination with the object prefix of 3rd person singular neutral pe-, 'it'.) | Example |
|---|---|---|---|---|
| 1S | ne- | **ne**kupqa 'I sleep' | -n- | pe**n**qwa'qa 'I eat it' |
| 2S | ’e- | **’e**kupqa 'you sleep' | -’- | pe’qwa'qa 'you eat it' |
| 3S | ø | kupqa 'he sleeps' | -ø- | peqwa'qa 'he eats it' |
| 1P | chem- | **chem**kupqa 'we sleep' | -chem- | pi**chem**qwawe 'we eat it' |
| 2P | ’em- | **’em**kupqa 'you guys sleep' | -’em- | pe**’em**qwawe 'you guys eat it' |
| 3P | hem- | **hem**kupqa 'they sleep' | -m- | pe**m**qwawe 'they eat it' |

==== Subject and object prefix combinations ====
Transitive verbs always appear with both subject (except for the 3rd person singular which is unmarked) and object prefixes. Even if an object noun is given in the sentence, the verb will take an object prefix that refers to it. In the prefix order, the object prefix always precedes the subject prefix, which often looses its vowels (compared to the subject prefixes seen in the Subject-marking prefixes section above). In the table below, subject-marking particles (which are often reduced to one consonant due to the vowel loss) are shown in bold.

| | me | you (sg.) | him/her/it; them (inanimate) | us | you (pl.) | them (animate) |
|---|---|---|---|---|---|---|
| I | ∅ | ’e**n**- | pe**n**-... | ∅ | ’eme**n**-... | me**n**-... |
| you (sg.) | ne’-... | ø | pe’-... | cheme’-... | ø | me’-... |
| he/she/it (Note: The third person singular subject is unmarked, leaving the object person-marking prefixes alone on the root. No confusion is possible with the identitical intransitive verb subject person-marking prefixes as Cahuilla verbs are either intransitive or transitive, but never can be both at the same time. In nekupqa for example, the ne- 1st person prefix can only be subject because -kup- is an intransitive verb, so that nekupqa → "I sleep"; whereas in neteewqa the ne- 1st person prefix can only be object because -teew- is a transitive verb: neteewqa → "he sees me". "I see" would be translated as penteewqa, with the compulsory 3rd person neutral or indefinite object prefix pe-, translated by "it" or left untranslated.) | ne-... | ’e-... | pe-... | cheme-... | ’eme-... | me-... |
| we | ø | ’e**chem**-... | pi**chem**-... | ø | ’eme**chem**-... | mi**chem**-... |
| you (pl.) | ne**’em**-... | ø | pe**’em**-... | cheme**’em**-... | ø | me**’em**-... |
| they | ne**m**-... | ’e**m**-... | pe**m**-... | cheme**m**-... | ’eme**m**-... | me**m**-... |

==== Affix order on the root ====
Every verb must take both -2 (subject) and at least on inflectional affix from -1 or +1 alongside the necessary stem. -1 and +1 are incompatible as is -4 and -1, as -4 only occurs in combination with +1's -nem.

Inflection positioning
| –4 | –3 | –2 | –1 | STEM | +1 |
|---|---|---|---|---|---|
| hax- / ’ax- expect., absol. (pros) | ne- Obj. 1sing. | ne- Subj. 1sing. | pe_{2}- localis | | -’i realized, absol. (perf) |
| Ø expect., non-absol. | ’e- 2 sing. | ’e- 2 sing. | | | -Ø non-realized, non-absol. |
| | pe- 3 sing. | Ø- 3 sing. | | | -nem expect. |
| | cheme- 1 plur. | chem- 1 plur. | | | -pulu’ / -pu’ / -alu’ possib. (sjv) |
| | ’eme- 2 plur. | ’em- 2 plur. | | | -e injunctive, absol., sing. (imp) |
| | me- 3 plur. | hem- 3 plur. | | | -am injunctive, absol., plur. (imp) |
| | | | | | -na injunctive, non-absol. (inj) |
| | tax- reflex./indef. | | | | -ve subordin., realized |
| | | | | | -pi subordin., non-realized |
| | | | | | -nuk subordin., gerundial |
| | | | | | -pa subord., when |

==== Conjugation table ====
Here is the intransitive verb -taxmu-, "to sing", fully conjugated in Cahuilla:

| Person | Singular | | | Plural | | |
| Person | First | Second | Third | First | Second | Third |
|---|---|---|---|---|---|---|
| | ne' | 'e' | pe' | chemem | 'emem | pe'em |
Indicative mood
| Present | netaxmuqa | 'etaxmuqa | taxmuqa | chemtaxmuwe | 'emtaxmuwe | hemtaxmuwe |
| Imperfect | netaxmuqa' | 'etaxmuqa' | taxmuqa' | chemtaxmuwe' | 'emtaxmuwe' | hemtaxmuwe' |
| Perfect | netaxmu'i | 'etaxmu'i | taxmu'i | chemtaxmu'i | 'emtaxmu'i | hemtaxmu'i |
| Perfect negative | kill netaxmu’ | kill 'etaxmu’ | kill taxmu’ | kill chemtaxmu’ | kill 'emtaxmu’ | kill hemtaxmu’ |
| Future | haxnetaxmune | hax'etaxmune | haxtaxmune | haxchemtaxmune | hax'emtaxmune | haxhemtaxmune |
| Continuous future | haxnetaxmunashne | hax'etaxmunashne | haxtaxmunashne | haxchemtaxmunashne | hax'emtaxmunashne | haxhemtaxmunashne |
Subjunctive mode
| Present | netaxmupu' | 'etaxmupu' | taxmupu' | chemtaxmupu' | 'emtaxmupu' | hemtaxmupu' |
| Past | netaxmupu' yeya | 'etaxmupu' yeya | taxmupu' yeya | chemtaxmupu' yeya | 'emtaxmupu' yeya | hemtaxmupu' yeya |
| Future | haxnetaxmune 'esan | hax'etaxmune 'esan | haxtaxmune 'esan | haxchemtaxmune 'esan | hax'emtaxmune 'esan | haxhemtaxmune 'esan |
Desiderative mood
| Present | netaxmuvichuqa | 'etaxmuvichuqa | taxmuvichuqa | chemtaxmuvichuwe | 'emtaxmuvichuwe | hemtaxmuvichuwe |
| Past | netaxmuvichuqa' | 'etaxmuvichuqa' | taxmuvichuqa' | chemtaxmuvichuwe' | 'emtaxmuvichuwe' | hemtaxmuvichuwe' |
Conative mood
| Present | netaxmu'ayawqa | 'etaxmu'ayawqa | taxmu'ayawqa | chemtaxmu'ayawwe | 'emtaxmu'ayawwe | hemtaxmu'ayawwe |
| Past | netaxmu'ayawqa' | 'etaxmu'ayawqa' | taxmu'ayawqa' | chemtaxmu'ayawwe' | 'emtaxmu'ayawwe' | hemtaxmu'ayawwe' |
| Future | haxnetaxmu'ayawne | hax'etaxmu'ayawne | haxtaxmu'ayawne | haxchemtaxmu'ayawne | hax'emtaxmu'ayawne | haxhemtaxmu'ayawne |
| Irrealis | haxnetaxmu'ayawalu' | hax'etaxmu'ayawalu' | haxtaxmu'ayawalu' | haxchemtaxmu'ayawalu' | hax'emtaxmu'ayawalu' | haxhemtaxmu'ayawalu' |
Injunctive mood
| Present | netaxmuna | 'etaxmuna | taxmuna | chemtaxmuna | 'emtaxmuna | hemtaxmuna |
Imperative mood
| Present | — | taxmu’ | — | chemtaxmu’am | taxmu’am | |

== Syntax ==
Although Cahuilla employs a relatively free word order, its underlying classification is that of a subject–object–verb (or SOV) language. Its verbs show heavy agreement, indicating the subject and object even when not overtly present, and the subject and object may appear after the verb, highlighting specific usage.
