= Injunctive =

Injunctive may refer to:

- Injunction, a legal concept
- Injunctive mood, a linguistic concept
