= Ancient Greek verbs =

Linguistic component of Ancient Greek

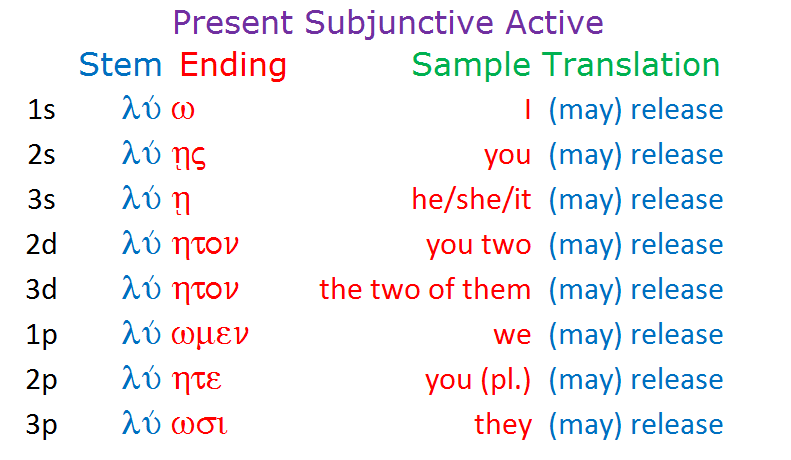
A chart showing the present subjunctive active forms of the verb λύω 'to release'.

Ancient Greek verbs have four moods (indicative, imperative, subjunctive and optative), three voices (active, middle and passive), as well as three persons (first, second and third) and three numbers (singular, dual and plural).

- In the indicative mood there are seven tenses: present, imperfect, future, aorist (the equivalent of past simple), perfect, pluperfect, and future perfect. (The last two, especially the future perfect, are rarely used).
- In the subjunctive and imperative mood, however, there are only three tenses (present, aorist, and perfect).
- The optative mood, infinitives and participles are found in four tenses (present, aorist, perfect, and future) and all three voices.

The distinction of the "tenses" in moods other than the indicative is predominantly one of aspect rather than time.

The different persons of a Greek verb are shown by changing the verb-endings; for example λύω (lúō) "I free", λύεις (lúeis) "you free", λύει (lúei) "he or she frees", etc. There are three persons in the singular ("I", "you (singular)", "he, she, it"), and three in the plural ("we", "you (plural)", "they"). In addition there are endings for the 2nd and 3rd persons dual ("you two", "they both"), but these are only very rarely used.

A distinction is traditionally made between the so-called athematic verbs (also called mi-verbs), with endings affixed directly to the root, and the thematic class of verbs which present a "thematic" vowel /o/ or /e/ before the ending. The endings are classified into primary (those used in the present, future, perfect and future perfect of the indicative, as well as in the subjunctive) and secondary (used in the aorist, imperfect, and pluperfect of the indicative, as well as in the optative).

To make the past tenses of the indicative mood, the vowel ε- (e-), called an "augment", is prefixed to the verb stem, e.g. aorist ἔ-λυσα (é-lusa) "I freed", imperfect ἔ-λυον (é-luon) "I was freeing". This augment is found only in the indicative, not in the other moods or in the infinitive or participle. To make the perfect tense the first consonant is "reduplicated", that is, repeated with the vowel e (λέλυκα (léluka) "I have freed", γέγραφα (gégrapha) "I have written"), or in some cases an augment is used in lieu of reduplication (e.g. ηὕρηκα (hēúrēka) "I have found"). Unlike the augment of past tenses, this reduplication or augment is retained in all the moods of the perfect tense as well as in the perfect infinitive and participle.

The Ancient Greek verbal system preserves nearly all the complexities of Proto-Indo-European (PIE). Ancient Greek also preserves the PIE middle voice and adds a passive voice, with separate forms only in the future and aorist (elsewhere, the middle forms are used).

== Voices ==
The Ancient Greek verb has three voices: active, middle, and passive. The middle and the passive voice are identical in the present, imperfect, perfect, and pluperfect tenses, but differ in the future and aorist tenses.

=== Active voice ===
Active voice verbs are those which end in -ω -ō or -μι -mi in the 1st person singular of the present tense. An active voice verb can be intransitive, transitive or reflexive (but intransitive is most common):

εἰς Ἀθήνᾱς ἔπλευσε.
eis Athḗnās épleuse.
He sailed to Athens.

ἐφύλαττον τὰ τείχη.
ephúlatton tà teíkhē
They were guarding the walls.

αὐτὸς αὑτὸν διέφθειρεν.
autòs hautòn diéphtheiren.
He killed himself.

=== Middle voice ===
Other verbs end in -ομαι (-omai) or -μαι (-mai) in the 1st person singular of the present tense. These can be either passive or non-passive in meaning. When the meaning of such a verb is not passive, it is known as a "middle voice" verb.

Middle voice verbs are usually intransitive, but can also be transitive. Often the middle endings make a transitive verb intransitive:

- παύομαι (paúomai) "I stop (intransitive)"
- ἵσταμαι (hístamai) "I stand (intransitive)"

Sometimes there is a reflexive meaning or an idea of doing something for one's own benefit:

- λούομαι (loúomai) "I have a bath"
- αἱρέομαι (hairéomai) "I take for myself, I choose"
- μεταπέμπομαι (metapémpomai) "I send for someone"

Sometimes there can be a reciprocal meaning:

- σπονδὰς ποιεῖσθαι (spondàs poieîsthai) "to make a treaty"

Quite a number of verbs which are active in the present tense become middle in the future tense, e.g.:

- λήψομαι (lḗpsomai) "I will take"
- ἀκούσομαι (akoúsomai) "I will hear"
- ἔσομαι (ésomai) "I will be"

==== Deponent middle verbs ====
A number of common verbs ending in -ομαι (-omai) or -μαι (-mai) have no active-voice counterpart. These are known as "deponent" verbs.

Deponent middle verbs include verbs such as the following. Some have a "weak" aorist:

- δέχομαι (dékhomai) "I receive" – aorist: ἐδεξάμην (edexámēn)
- μάχομαι (mákhomai) "I fight" – aorist: ἐμαχεσάμην (emakhesámēn)
- ἀποκρίνομαι (apokrínomai) "I answer" – aorist: ἀπεκρινάμην (apekrinámēn)

With "strong" aorist:

- γίγνομαι (gígnomai) "I become" – aorist: ἐγενόμην (egenómēn)
- ἀφικνέομαι (aphiknéomai) "I arrive" – aorist: ἀφικόμην (aphikómēn)
- πυνθάνομαι (punthánomai) "I find out" – aorist: ἐπυθόμην (eputhómēn)
- ὑπισχνέομαι (hupiskhnéomai) "I promise" – aorist: ὑπεσχόμην (hupeskhómēn)

Irregular:

- ἔρχομαι (érkhomai) "I come" – aorist: ἦλθον (êlthon)

==== Aorist middle ====
Some middle deponent verbs have a weak aorist tense formed with -σα- (-sa-), e.g. ἐδεξάμην (edexámēn), but frequently they have a strong aorist middle such as ἀφικόμην (aphikómēn) "I arrived" or ἐγενόμην (egenómēn) "I became". (ἔρχομαι (érkhomai) "I come" is irregular in that it uses a strong aorist active ἦλθον (êlthon) "I came" as its aorist tense.)

==== Passive deponent verbs ====
All the above, since they have an aorist in the middle voice, are known as middle deponents. There are also deponent passive verbs with aorists in -θη- (-thē-), such as the following:

- δύναμαι (dúnamai) "I am able" – aorist: ἐδυνήθην (edunḗthēn)
- βούλομαι (boúlomai) "I am minded to, I want" – aorist: ἠβουλήθην (ēboulḗthēn)
- οἴομαι (oíomai) "I think" – aorist: ᾠήθην (ōiḗthēn)

==== Sentences with deponent verbs ====
τὰ δῶρα ἐδέξατο.
tà dôra edéxato.
He received the gifts.

ἐγγὺς δὲ γενομένων τῶν Ἀθηναίων, ἐμάχοντο.
engùs dè genoménōn tôn Athēnaíōn, emákhonto.
When the Athenians came near, the two sides began fighting.

οὐκέτι ἐδυνήθη πλείω εἰπεῖν
oukéti edunḗthē pleíō eipeîn
He became unable to say any more.

=== Passive voice ===
Occasionally a verb ending in -ομαι (-omai) has a clear passive sense. If so, it is said to be in the passive voice:

ἡ πόλις ὑπὸ τῶν Λακεδαιμονίων ἤρχετο.
hē pólis hupò tôn Lakedaimoníōn ḗrkheto.
The city was being ruled by the Spartans.

ἐν τῷ νόμῳ γέγραπται.
en tôi nómōi gégraptai.
It is written in the law. (lit. it has been written)

Usually when used passively, -ομαι (-omai) verbs have an aorist tense containing -θη- (-thē-) in the ending:

ἐκεῖνοι κατ’ ἀξίᾱν ἐτιμήθησαν.
ekeînoi kat’ axíān etimḗthēsan.
Those men were deservedly honoured.

Occasionally, an aorist passive can have an ending with -η- (-ē-). This is known as the 2nd aorist or strong aorist passive, and uses a different verb-stem from the present. In the example below, the stem is φθαρ- instead of the present stem φθειρ-:

οἱ πολλοὶ ἐφθάρησαν.
hoi polloì ephthárēsan.
The majority were killed.

Deponent middle verbs can also be made passive in some tenses. Thus αἱρέομαι (hairéomai) "I choose" has an aorist passive ᾑρέθην (hēiréthēn) "I was chosen":

στρατηγὸς ὑπ’ αὐτῶν ᾑρέθη.
stratēgòs hup’ autôn hēiréthē.
He was chosen by them as general.

The endings with -θη- (-thē-) and -η- (-ē-) were originally intransitive actives rather than passives and sometimes have an intransitive meaning even in Classical Greek. For example, ἐσώθην (esṓthēn) (from σῴζω sōízō "I save") often means "I got back safely" rather than "I was saved":

οὐκ ἐσώθη ἡ ναῦς εἰς τὸν Πειραιᾶ.
ouk esṓthē hē naûs eis tòn Peiraiâ.
The ship did not get back safely to Piraeus.

== Thematic and athematic verbs ==
Ancient Greek verbs can be divided into two groups, the thematic (in which a thematic vowel /e/ or /o/ is added before the ending, e.g. λύ-ο-μεν (lú-o-men) "we free"), and the athematic (in which the endings are attached directly to the stem, e.g. ἐσ-μέν (es-mén) "we are". Thematic verbs are much more numerous.

=== Thematic verbs ===
==== Active verbs ====
Thematic verbs, in the 1st person singular of the present tense active, end in -ω (-ō). These are very numerous, for example, λέγω (légō) "I say", γράφω (gráphō) "I write", πέμπω (pémpō) "I send", etc. The endings of these tend to be regular:

- λέγω, λέγεις, λέγει, (λέγετον, λέγετον,) λέγομεν, λέγετε, λέγουσι(ν)

légō, légeis, légei, (légeton, légeton,) légomen, légete, légousi(n)
I say, you say, he/she/it says, (you two say, they both say,) we say, you (pl.) say, they say

The forms in brackets are the dual number, used for two people, and which exists only in the 2nd and 3rd person; it is rather rare, but still used sometimes by authors such as Aristophanes and Plato:

- Ὅμηρός τε καὶ Ἡσίοδος ταὐτὰ λέγετον.

Hómērós te kaì Hēsíodos tautà légeton.
Homer and Hesiod both say the same things.

The present infinitive active of thematic verbs is -ειν (-ein), e.g. λέγειν (légein) "to say".

==== Middle verbs ====
Thematic verbs are also found in the middle voice, with the 1st person singular ending -ομαι (-omai) e.g. ἀποκρῑ́νομαι (apokrī́nomai) "I answer", γίγνομαι (gígnomai) "I become". The endings of the present tense go as follows:

- -ομαι, -ει/-ῃ, -εται, (-εσθον, -εσθον), -ομεθα, -εσθε, -ονται

-omai, -ei/-ēi, -etai, (-esthon, -esthon), -ometha, -esthe, -ontai
I, you (singular), he/she/it, (you two, the two of them), we, you (plural), they

The middle present infinitive is -εσθαι (-esthai), e.g. ἀποκρῑ́νεσθαι (apokrī́nesthai) "to answer".

Some middle verbs are attested in the first person dual, albeit rarely:

Νὼ μὲν οὖν ὁρμώμεθον
Nṑ mèn oûn hormṓmethon
And so we two are going

Many middle-voice verbs, such as ἀποκρῑ́νομαι (apokrī́nomai) "I answer", are deponent, that is to say, they have no corresponding active form. Other middle verbs, such as παύομαι (paúomai) "I cease (doing something)" (intransitive), have a corresponding active form: παύω (paúō) "I stop (something)" (transitive).

==== Passive verbs ====
Passive verbs, in the present, imperfect, and perfect tenses, have exactly the same endings as middle verbs. Examples are διώκομαι (diṓkomai) "I am pursued" and κελεύομαι (keleúomai) "I am ordered (by someone)".

In the aorist tense, however, they differ from middle verbs in that they use the endings -σθην (-sthēn), -θην (-thēn), or -ην (-ēn), for example ἐδιώχθην (ediṓkhthēn) "I was pursued", ἐκελεύσθην (ekeleústhēn) "I was ordered", ἐβλάβην (eblábēn) "I was harmed"; whereas middle verbs tend to have an aorist ending in -σάμην (-sámēn), -άμην (-ámēn), or -όμην (-ómēn), for example ἐπαυσάμην (epausámēn) "I stopped", ἀπεκρινάμην (apekrinámēn) "I answered", ἐγενόμην (egenómēn) "I became".

==== Contracted verbs ====
A special class of thematic verbs are the contracted verbs. In the dictionary these are entered as ending -άω (-áō), -έω (-éō) or -όω (-óō), for example ὁράω (horáō) "I see", ποιέω (poiéō) "I do", δηλόω (dēlóō) "I show"; but in most cases when they are found in a text the vowel α, ε, ο (a, e, o) contracts with the ending to make a single vowel. Thus the present tense of ὁράω (horáō) "I see" goes as follows:

- ὁρῶ, ὁρᾷς, ὁρᾷ, (ὁρᾶτον, ὁρᾶτον,) ὁρῶμεν, ὁρᾶτε, ὁρῶσι(ν)

horô, horâis, horâi, (horâton, horâton,) horômen, horâte, horôsi(n)
I see, you see, he/she/it sees, (you both see, they both see,) we see, you (pl.) see, they see

while the present tense of ποιέω (poiéō) "I do" is as follows:

- ποιῶ, ποιεῖς, ποιεῖ, (ποιεῖτον, ποιεῖτον,) ποιοῦμεν, ποιεῖτε, ποιοῦσι(ν)

poiô, poieîs, poieî, (poieîton, poieîton,) poioûmen, poieîte, poioûsi(n)
I do, you do, he/she/it does, (you both do, they both do,) we do, you (plural) do, they do

and the present tense of δηλόω (dēlóō) "I show" is as follows:

- δηλῶ, δηλοῖς, δηλοῖ, (δηλοῦτον, δηλοῦτον,) δηλοῦμεν, δηλοῦτε, δηλοῦσι(ν)

dēlô, dēloîs, dēloî, (dēloûton, dēloûton,) dēloûmen, dēloûte, dēloûsi(n)
I show, you show, he/she/it shows, (you both show, they both show,) we show, you (plural) show, they show

The present infinitive active of the three types of contracted verbs is ὁρᾶν (horân) "to see", ποιεῖν (poieîn), "to do", δηλοῦν (dēloûn) "to show".

Contracted verbs are also found in the middle and passive voices, e.g. ἀφικνέομαι/ἀφικνοῦμαι (aphiknéomai/aphiknoûmai) "I arrive" and τιμάομαι/τιμῶμαι (timáomai/timômai) "I am honoured".

=== Athematic verbs ===
==== Active ====
Athematic verbs have -μι (-mi) in the 1st person singular of the present tense, e.g. εἰμί (eimí) "I am", φημί (phēmí) "I say", δίδωμι (dídōmi) "I give", τίθημι (títhēmi) "I put", ἵστημι (hístēmi) "I stand (transitive)". In the middle voice they end in -μαι, e.g. δύναμαι (dúnamai) "I am able". The present tense of εἶμι (eîmi) "I (will) go" is generally used with future meaning in the classical period.

These verbs present many irregularities in conjugation. For example, the present tense of εἰμί (eimí) "I am" goes as follows:

- εἰμί, εἶ, ἐστί(ν), (ἐστόν, ἐστόν,) ἐσμέν, ἐστέ, εἰσί(ν)

eimí, eî, estí(n), (estón, estón,) esmén, esté, eisí(n)
I am, you are, he/she/it is, (you both are, they both are), we are, you (plural) are, they are.

The present tense of the verb εἶμι (eîmi) "I (will) go" is as follows:

- εἶμι, εἶ, εἶσι(ν), (ἴτον, ἴτον,) ἴμεν, ἴτε, ἴᾱσι(ν)

eîmi, eî, eîsi(n), (íton, íton,) ímen, íte, íāsi(n)
I will go, you will go, he/she/it will go, (you both will go, they both will go), we will go, you (plural) will go, they will go

whereas the present tense of δίδωμι (dídōmi) "I give" goes as follows:

- δίδωμι, δίδως, δίδωσι(ν), δίδομεν, δίδοτε, διδόᾱσι(ν)

dídōmi, dídōs, dídōsi(n), dídomen, dídote, didóāsi(n)
I give, you give, he/she/it gives, we give, you (plural) give, they give

The dual of this verb, theoretically δίδοτον (dídoton), is not found.

The active infinitive of athematic verbs ends in -ναι (-nai), e.g. εἶναι (eînai) "to be", ἰέναι (iénai) "to go", διδόναι (didónai) "to give".

==== Middle ====
Athematic verbs are also found in the middle voice, e.g. ἵσταμαι (hístamai) "I stand" or δύναμαι (dúnamai) "I am able", with endings as follows:

- -μαι, -σαι, -ται, (-σθον, -σθον), -μεθα, -σθε, -νται

-mai, -sai, -tai, (-sthon, -sthon), -metha, -sthe, -ntai
I, you (singular), he/she/it, (you two, the two of them), we, you (plural), they

The infinitive is -σθαι (-sthai).

==== The verb οἶδα (oîda) ====
The verb οἶδα (oîda) "I know", is irregular. Its endings are those of an athematic perfect tense, and go as follows:

- οἶδα, οἶσθα, οἶδε(ν), (ἴστον, ἴστον,) ἴσμεν, ἴστε, ἴσᾱσι(ν)

oîda, oîstha, oîde(n), (íston, íston,) ísmen, íste, ísāsi(n)
I know, you know, he/she/it knows, (you both know, they both know), we know, you (plural) know, they know

The infinitive of οἶδα (oîda) is εἰδέναι (eidénai) "to know".

== Tenses ==
=== The tense system ===
The Ancient Greek verbal system has seven tense-aspect forms, traditionally called "tenses" (χρόνοι, khrónoi, singular χρόνος, khrónos). The temporal distinctions only appear in the indicative mood as shown on the table below:

		perfective aspect	imperfective aspect	perfect aspect
primary sequence	future time	future		future perfect
primary sequence	present time	present		perfect
secondary sequence	past time	aorist, (imperfect)	imperfect	pluperfect

In the subjunctive and imperative moods, however, only three tenses are used, and they distinguish aspect only, not time:

perfective aspect	imperfective aspect	perfect aspect
aorist	present	perfect

The optative mood likewise uses these three tenses, but there is also a future optative, used mainly to report indirectly what would be a future indicative in direct speech.

Ancient Greek has no perfect progressive or past perfect progressive. Thus, the meaning "he has been doing" is typically expressed with the present tense, and "he had been doing (earlier)" is expressed with the imperfect tense:

πολλά γε ἔτη ἤδη εἰμὶ ἐν τῇ τέχνῃ.
pollá ge étē ḗdē eimì en têi tékhnēi.
I have been (lit. I am) in the business for many years now.

τὸ πλοῖον ἧκεν ἐν ᾧ ἐπῑ́νομεν.
tò ploîon hêken en hôi epī́nomen.
The boat arrived in which we had (earlier) been drinking.

=== Formation of the tenses ===
For further information on the endings, see Ancient Greek grammar tables.

==== Principal parts of verbs ====
Dictionaries of Ancient Greek usually give six principal parts for any verb. For example, for the verb παιδεύω (paideúō) "I teach, train" the six parts are as follows:

- παιδεύω, παιδεύσω, ἐπαίδευσα, πεπαίδευκα, πεπαίδευμαι, ἐπαιδεύθην

paideúō, paideúsō, epaídeusa, pepaídeuka, pepaídeumai, epaideúthēn
I teach, I will teach, I taught, I have taught, I have been taught, I was taught

The best guide to the true stem of the verb is often in the future or aorist active tense (after removing any added σ sigma markers), because the present system often has progressive markers that distort the stem of the verb.

The principal parts are these:

- The present tense: παιδεύω (paideúō) "I teach"

Endings: -ω -εις -ει (-ετον -ετον) -ομεν -ετε -ουσι(ν)

- The future tense: παιδεύσω (paideúsō) "I will teach"

Endings: -σω -σεις -σει (-σετον -σετον) -σομεν -σετε -σουσι(ν)

- The aorist active tense: ἐπαίδευσα (epaídeusa) "I taught"

Endings: -σα -σας -σε(ν) (-σατον -σατην) -σαμεν -σατε -σαν

- The perfect active tense: πεπαίδευκα (pepaídeuka) "I have taught"

Endings: -κα -κας -κε(ν) (-κατον -κατον) -καμεν -κατε -κᾱσι(ν)

- The perfect tense middle or passive: πεπαίδευμαι (pepaídeumai) "I have been taught"

Endings: -μαι -σαι -ται (-σθον -σθον) -μεθα -σθε -νται

- The aorist passive tense: ἐπαιδεύθην (epaideúthēn) "I was taught"

Endings: -θην -θης -θη (-θητον -θητην) -θημεν -θητε -θησαν

As above, the endings in brackets are 2nd and 3rd person dual number ('the two of you', 'the two of them'). These are less often used than the singular and plural.

==== Other tenses ====
Other tenses can be formed on the basis of these. For example, the imperfect tense ἐπαίδευον (epaídeuon) "I was teaching" is based on the present stem with the addition of the prefix ἔ- (é-) (called an "augment", see below), and the pluperfect ἐπεπαιδεύκη (epepaideúkē) "I had taught" is formed from the perfect stem:

- The imperfect tense: ἐπαίδευον (epaídeuon) "I was teaching", "I used to teach"

Endings: -ον -ες -ε(ν) (-ετον -ετην) -ομεν -ετε -ον

- The pluperfect tense: ἐπεπαιδεύκη (epepaideúkē) "I had taught"

Endings: -κη (-κειν) -ης (-κεις) -κει(ν) ( – ) -κεμεν -κετε -κεσαν

==== Future and aorist without sigma ====
Not all verbs have a future tense made with -σ- (-s-). Some, particularly those whose stem ends in λ, μ, ν, ρ (l, m, n, r) such as ἀγγέλλω (angéllō) "I announce" and μένω (menō) "I remain", have a contracted future, with endings like the verb ποιέω (poiéō). These same verbs also usually have an aorist without sigma:

- Contracted future: ἀγγελῶ (angelô) "I will announce"

Endings: -ῶ -εῖς -εῖ (-εῖτον -εῖτον) -οῦμεν -εῖτε -οῦσι(ν)

- Aorist without sigma: ἤγγειλα (ḗngeila) "I announced"

Endings: -α -ας -ε(ν) (-ατον -ατην) -αμεν -ατε -αν

==== Strong aorist ====
Some common verbs, instead of the ordinary (weak) aorist tense ending in -σα, have an aorist ending in -ον etc. exactly like the imperfect; this is known as a "strong" aorist or "2nd" aorist. However, it differs from the imperfect in that the stem of the verb is different. Thus the aorist of φεύγω (pheúgō) 'I flee' is ἔφυγον (éphugon) 'I fled', with stem φυγ- (phug-), contrasting with the imperfect ἔφευγον (épheugon) 'I was fleeing', with stem φευγ- (pheug-). The present system (imperfect and present tenses) of this verb φεύγω (pheúgō) has an added ε epsilon as a progressive marker. The aorist and other tenses reflect the true stem φυγ- (phug-).

Other strong aorists are ἦλθον (êlthon) 'I came', ἔλαβον (élabon) 'I took', εἶπον (eîpon) 'I said', ἔφαγον (éphagon) 'I ate'; and in the middle voice ἐγενόμην (egenómēn) 'I became' and ἀφικόμην (aphikómēn) 'I arrived'.

==== Root aorist ====
Many verbs have an aorist without the sigma markers and characteristic endings of the regular aorist. Typically, these verbs have present progressive markers added to the stem in the present system, so that the basic stem is used in the aorist and in the other aspects. One example is the verb βαίνω (baínō), "I go", which becomes ἔβην (ébēn).

==== Less regular principal parts ====
However, by no means all Ancient Greek verbs are as regular in their principal parts as παιδεύω (paideúō). For example, the verb λαμβάνω (lambánō) "I take" has the following parts:

- λαμβάνω, λήψομαι, ἔλαβον, εἴληφα, εἴλημμαι, ἐλήφθην

lambánō, lḗpsomai, élabon, eílēpha, eílēmmai, elḗphthēn
I take, I will take, I took, I have taken, I have been taken, I was taken

As can be seen, the stems used (λαμβάν-, λήφ-, λαβ-, λήφ-) (lambán-, lḗph-, lab-, lḗph-) etc. vary from tense to tense. They all come from the same root, but the stem used in the present tense, λαμβάνω (lambánō), has an extra μ (m) and αν (an) as a progressive tense marker; in the other tenses the vowel in the root varies between α (a) and η (ē); and the final consonant, β, changes by assimilation to ψ (ps) or μ (m), or by aspiration to φ (ph).

The verb (ἄγω) (ágō) "I lead" goes:

- ἄγω, ἄξω, ἤγαγον, ἦχα, ἦγμαι, ἤχθην

ágō, áxō, ḗgagon, êkha, êgmai, ḗkhthēn
I lead, I will lead, I led, I have led, I have been led, I was led

Both of the above verbs have a "strong aorist" or "2nd aorist" ending in -ον (-on) rather than the usual -σα (-sa), and the perfect tense has an aspirated consonant φ, χ (ph, kh) before the ending instead of κ (k).

The tenses of δίδωμι (dídōmi) "I give" are as follows:

- δίδωμι, δώσω, ἔδωκα, δέδωκα, δέδομαι, ἐδόθην

dídōmi, dṓsō, édōka, dédōka, dédomai, edóthēn
I give, I will give, I gave, I have given, I have been given (to someone), I was given (to someone)

The aorist of this verb is irregular, since it ends in κα (ka). However, this κ (k) is found only in the singular, and disappears in the plural, e.g. 3rd pl. ἔδοσαν (édosan) "they gave". The verbs τίθημι (títhēmi) "I put" and ἵημι (híēmi) "I send" are similar, with aorists ἔθηκα (éthēka) 3rd pl. ἔθεσαν (éthesan) and ἧκα (hêka) 3rd pl. εἷσαν (heîsan) respectively.

However, ἵστημι (hístēmi) "I stand (something)" does not follow this pattern and has a different aorist:

- ἵστημι, στήσω, ἔστησα (trans.)/ἔστην (intrans.), ἕστηκα (intrans.), ἕσταμαι, ἐστάθην

hístēmi, stḗsō, éstēsa/éstēn, héstēka, héstamai, estáthēn
I stand (something), I will stand (something), I stood (something)/I stood, I have stood/am standing, I stand, I stood/was stood

The present stems of three of these verbs δίδωμι (dídōmi), τίθημι (títhēmi) and ἵστημι (hístēmi) are reduplicated as a progressive marker, meaning that the true stems δο- (do-), θε- (the-), and στα- (sta-) were doubled up in the present as δίδω-, τίθη-, and ἵστη- (originally σίστη-) .

==== Verbs using more than one stem ====
Some verbs employ suppletion in their inflection: that is, they use different stems ‒ derived from originally different verbs ‒ for the different tenses (similar to English verbs "am, was, been" and "go, went, gone", or French “aller, je vais, j'irai”). For example, the verb φέρω (phérō) "I bring, I bear" has the following principal parts using stems derived from three originally different verbs:

- φέρω, οἴσω, ἤνεγκα/ἤνεγκον, ἐνήνοχα, ἐνήνεγμαι, ἠνέχθην

phérō, oísō, ḗnenka/ḗnenkon, enḗnokha, enḗnegmai, ēnékhthēn
I bring, I will bring, I brought, I have brought, I have been brought, I was brought

ὁράω (horáō) "I see" is another verb made from stems from three different roots, namely ὁρά (horá), ὀπ (op) and ἰδ (id) (the last of these, which was originally pronounced ϝιδ- (wid-), is related to the root of the Latin verb video):

- ὁράω, ὄψομαι, εἶδον, ἑόρᾱκα/ἑώρᾱκα, ἑώρᾱμαι/ὦμμαι, ὤφθην

horáō, ópsomai, eîdon, heórāka/heṓrāka, heṓrāmai/ômmai, ṓphthēn
I see, I will see, I saw, I have seen, I have been seen, I was seen

ἔρχομαι (érkhomai) "I come" or "I go" is also irregular. This verb has only four principal parts, since there is no passive:

- ἔρχομαι, ἐλεύσομαι/εἶμι, ἦλθον, ἐλήλυθα

érkhomai, eleúsomai/eîmi, êlthon, elḗlutha
I come/go, I will come/go, I came/went, I have come/gone

This verb is made more complex by the fact that in Attic Greek (that is, the dialect of most of the major classical authors), the present tense (apart from the indicative mood), imperfect tense, and future are usually replaced by parts of the irregular verb εἶμι (eîmi) "I (will) go": The indicative of εἶμι (eîmi) is generally used with future significance in the classical period ("I will go") but the other parts such as the infinitive ἰέναι (iénai) "to go" are not future in meaning.

==== The past-tense augment ====
The three past tenses (imperfect, aorist, and pluperfect), in the classical period, are made by adding a prefix ἐ- (e-), called an "augment", on the beginning of the verb. Thus from γράφω (gráphō) "I write" are made:

- ἔγραφον (égraphon) "I was writing"
- ἔγραψα (égrapsa) "I wrote"
- ἐγεγράφη (egegráphē) "I had written"

This past-tense augment is found only in the indicative mood, not in the subjunctive, infinitive, participle, or other parts of the verb.

When a verb starts with a vowel, the augment usually merges with the vowel to make a long vowel. Thus /e/ + /a/ > /ē/, /e/ + /e/ > /ē/ (sometimes /ei/), /e/ + /i/ > /ī/, /e/ + /o/ > /ō/ and so on:

- ἦγον (êgon) "I was leading", from ἄγω (ágō) "I lead"
- εἶχον (eîkhon) "I had, I was holding", from ἐχω (ekhō) "I have, I hold"
- ᾤκουν (ṓikoun) "I was living in", from οἰκέω (oikéō) "I live in"

When a verb starts with a prepositional prefix, the augment usually goes after the prefix (although there are some verbs where it goes before the prefix, or even in both places):

- κατέβην (katébēn) "I went down", from καταβαίνω (katabaínō) "I go down"
- ἀνέῳξα (anéōixa) or ἤνοιξα (ḗnoixa) "I opened", from ἀνοίγνυμι (anoígnumi) "I open"

In Homer, and occasionally in Herodotus, the augment is sometimes omitted.

==== Perfect tenses ====
The perfect tense is formed by repeating the first consonant of the stem with the vowel ε (e). This is known as "reduplication":

- γέγραφα (gégrapha) "I have written", from γράφω (gráphō) "I write"
- βεβίωκα (bebíōka) "I have lived", from βιόω (bióō) "I pass my life"
- δέδωκα (dédōka) "I have given", from δίδωμι (dídōmi) "I give"

When the first consonant of the verb is aspirated (θ, φ, χ) (th, ph, kh), the reduplication is made with the equivalent unaspirated consonant (τ, π, κ) (t, p, k):

- τέθνηκα (téthnēka) "I have died", from (ἀπο)θνῄσκω ([apo]thnḗiskō) "I die"
- πέφευγα (pépheuga) "I have fled", from φεύγω (pheúgō) "I flee"
- κεχάρηκα (kekhárēka) "I am very happy", from χαίρω (khaírō) "I am happy"

When the verb starts with a vowel, ζ (z) or with a combination of consonants such as γν (gn) or στρ (str), instead of reduplication an augment is used:

- ηὕρηκα (hēúrēka) "I have found", from εὑρίσκω (heurískō) "I find"
- ᾕρηκα (hḗirēka) "I have captured", from αἱρέω (hairéō) "I capture"
- ἔγνωκα (égnōka) "I have learned", from γιγνώσκω (gignṓskō) "I learn" (with the root γνω-, gnō-)

More complex kinds of reduplication are found in:

- ἀκήκοα (akḗkoa) "I have heard", from ἀκούω (akoúō) "I hear"
- ἐλήλυθα (elḗlutha) "I have come", from ἦλθον (êlthon) "I came"

Unlike the past-tense augment, this reduplication or perfect-tense augment is found in every part of the perfect tense, including the infinitive and participles.

=== Meanings of the tenses ===
The meanings of the tenses are as follows:

==== The present tense ====
The present tense (Greek ἐνεστώς (enestṓs) "standing within") can be imperfective or perfective, and be translated "I do (now)", "I do (regularly)", "I am doing (now)":

ὄμνῡμι πάντας θεούς.
ómnūmi pántas theoús.
I swear by all the gods!

τὸν ἄνδρα ὁρῶ.
tòn ándra horô.
I see the man!

ᾱ̓εὶ ταὐτὰ λέγεις, ὦ Σώκρατες.
āeì tautà légeis, ô Sṓkrates.
You are always saying the same things, Socrates!

“ὦ Σώκρατες,” ἔφη, “ἐγρήγορας ἢ καθεύδεις;”
“ô Sṓkrates,” éphē, “egrḗgoras ḕ katheúdeis?”
"O Socrates", he said, "have you woken up, or are you sleeping?"

The present tense is frequently used in historical narrative, especially to describe exciting moments:

ῑ̔́ετο ἐπ’ αὐτὸν καὶ τιτρώσκει.
hī́eto ep’ autòn kaì titrṓskei.
He hurls himself at him and wounds him.

==== Imperfect tense ====
The imperfect tense (Greek παρατατικός (paratatikós) "for prolonging", from παρατείνω (parateínō) "prolong") is used in the indicative mood only. It often indicates a continuing situation in the past, rather than an event. It can be translated as "was doing", "used to do", "would do", etc., referring to either a progressive, habitual, or continual situation:

ὁ λοχαγὸς ᾔδει ὅπου ἔκειτο ἡ ἐπιστολή.
ho lokhagòs ḗidei hópou ékeito hē epistolḗ.
The captain knew where the letter was lying.

ἐστρατοπεδεύοντο ἑκάστοτε ἀπέχοντες ἀλλήλων παρασάγγην καὶ πλέον.
estratopedeúonto hekástote apékhontes allḗlōn parasángēn kaì pléon.
Every night the (two armies) would camp a parasang or more apart from each other.

ταῦτα πολὺν χρόνον οὕτως ἐγίγνετο
taûta polùn khrónon hoútōs egígneto.
These things carried on like this for long time.

Often "began doing" is a possible translation:

συμβαλόντες τᾱ̀ς ἀσπίδας ἐωθοῦντο, ἐμάχοντο, ἀπέκτεινον, ἀπέθνῃσκον.
sumbalóntes tā̀s aspídas eōthoûnto, emákhonto, apékteinon, apéthnēiskon.
Throwing together their shields, they began shoving, fighting, killing, and dying.

μετὰ τὸ δεῖπνον τὸ παιδίον ἐβόα.
metà tò deîpnon tò paidíon ebóa.
After dinner the baby began crying.

ἐπειδὴ δὲ ἕως ἐγένετο, διέβαινον τὴν γέφῡραν.
epeidḕ dè héōs egéneto, diébainon tḕn géphūran.
And when dawn came, they began crossing the bridge.

As noted above, the imperfect can also mean "had been doing", referring to a situation which existed earlier than the time of the main verb:

ἀπέστειλαν τὰς ναῦς ᾱ̔́σπερ παρεσκευάζοντο.
apésteilan tàs naûs hā́sper pareskeuázonto.
They sent off the ships which they had been preparing.

εἰσήγαγον ἰᾱτρὸν ᾧ πολλὰ ἔτη ἐχρώμην.
eisḗgagon iātròn hôi pollà étē ekhrṓmēn
I brought in a doctor that I had been using for many years.

However, although the imperfect usually describes a situation, it is often used in narrative where English would use a simple past, especially with verbs meaning "send", "go", "say", and "order":

ἐς τᾱ̀ς Ἀθήνᾱς ἄγγελον ἔπεμπον.
es tā̀s Athḗnās ángelon épempon.
They sent off a messenger to Athens.

Μίνδαρος κατιδὼν τὴν μάχην ... ἐβοήθει.
Míndaros katidṑn tḕn mákhēn ... eboḗthei.
Mindaros, seeing the battle from afar, set off to help.

ἐκέλευον συνδειπνεῖν ... ἐδειπνοῦμεν ... ἀπιὼν ᾤχετο ... ἐκάθευδον.
ekéleuon sundeipneîn ... edeipnoûmen ... apiṑn ṓikheto ...ekátheudon.
I invited him to join me for dinner ... we sat down to dinner ... he went away ... I went to sleep.

The distinction between imperfect and aorist in the above examples can be seen not so much in terms of perfectivity vs. imperfectivity, as in terms of telicity vs. atelicity. The aorist ἐδειπνήσαμεν (edeipnḗsamen) would mean "we finished dinner" and would be a telic verb, implying that the action was carried through to its end, whereas the imperfect ἐδειπνοῦμεν (edeipnoûmen) would mean "we began eating dinner" and would be atelic, implying that the action was started but not necessarily completed. Similarly the aorist ἔπεισα (épeisa) means "I successfully persuaded", whereas the imperfect ἔπειθον (épeithon) means "I urged" or "I attempted to persuade":

ἔπειθον ἀποτρέπεσθαι· οἱ δ’ οὐχ ὑπήκουον.
épeithon apotrépesthai; hoi d’ oukh hupḗkouon.
They urged them to turn back, but they wouldn't listen.

Another meaning of the imperfect indicative is to refer to unreal (counterfactual) situations in present or past time. To give the meaning "would", the particle ἄν (án) is added:

ταῦτα δὲ οὐκ ἂν ἐδύναντο ποιεῖν, εἰ μὴ διαίτῃ μετρίᾳ ἐχρῶντο.
taûta dè ouk àn edúnanto poieîn, ei mḕ diaítēi metríāi ekhrônto.
They wouldn't be able to do this if they weren't following a temperate diet.

==== Future tense ====
The future tense (Greek μέλλων (méllōn) "going to be") describes an event or a state of affairs that will happen in the future. For example, it can be something promised or predicted:

ἄξω ῡ̔μᾶς εἰς τὴν Τρῳάδα.
áxō hūmâs eis tḕn Trōiáda.
I will lead you to the Troad.

ἥξω παρὰ σὲ αὔριον, ἐὰν θεὸς ἐθέλῃ.
hḗxō parà sè aúrion, eàn theòs ethélēi.
I will come to see you tomorrow, if God is willing.

It can also be used after ὅπως (hópōs) for strong commands and prohibitions:

ὅπως ταῦτα μηδεὶς ἀνθρώπων πεύσεται.
hópōs taûta mēdeìs anthrṓpōn peúsetai.
Make sure that no one finds out about these things.

==== Aorist tense ====
The aorist tense (Greek ἀόριστος (aóristos) "unbounded" or "indefinite") describes a finished action in the past.

κατέβην χθὲς εἰς Πειραιᾶ.
katébēn khthès eis Peiraiâ.
I went down yesterday to Piraeus.

Often in narrative it is found mixed with present and imperfect tenses:

ἧκεν ἐκείνη καὶ τὴν θύρᾱν ἀνέῳξεν.
hêken ekeínē kaì tḕn thúrān anéōixen.
She came back (imperfect) and opened (aorist) the door.

ἐφύλαττεν ἕως ἐξηῦρεν ὅ τι εἴη τὸ αἴτιον.
ephúlatten héōs exēûren hó ti eíē tò aítion.
She kept watch (imperfect) until she found out (aorist) what the cause was.

Often an aorist is equivalent to an English pluperfect tense, for example after ἐπεί (epeí) "when" or in relative clauses in sentences such as the following:

ἐπεὶ δ’ ἐδείπνησαν, ἐξῆγε τὸ στράτευμα.
epeì d’ edeípnēsan, exêge tò stráteuma.
When they had dined, he led the army out.

ἐκέλευσέ με τὴν ἐπιστολὴν ἣν ἔγραψα δοῦναι.
ekéleusé me tḕn epistolḕn hḕn égrapsa doûnai
He ordered me to give him the letter which I had written.

Another meaning of the aorist indicative is to refer to unreal (counterfactual) events in past time. To give the meaning "would", the particle ἄν (án) is added:

οὐκ ἂν ἐποίησεν ταῦτα, εἰ μὴ ἐγὼ αὐτὸν ἐκέλευσα.
ouk àn epoíēsen taûta, ei mḕ egṑ autòn ekéleusa.
He would not have done this, if I had not ordered him.

==== Perfect tense ====
The perfect tense (Greek παρακείμενος (parakeímenos) "lying nearby"), much as the English perfect tense, often describes a recent event of which the present result is important:

ἀκηκόατε, ἑωράκατε· δικάζετε
akēkóate, heōrákate; dikázete
You have heard and you have seen (the evidence); now make your decision.

It can also, like the English perfect, be used experientially, of something that has often or always happened in the past:

ὑμεῖς ἐμοῦ πολλάκις ἀκηκόατε λέγοντος
humeîs emoû pollákis akēkóate légontos
You have often heard me speaking.

In some verbs the perfect tense can be translated by a present tense in English, e.g. μέμνημαι (mémnēmai) "I remember", ἕστηκα (héstēka) "I am standing"/"I stand", κέκτημαι (kéktēmai) "I possess", οἶδα (oîda) "I know":

ἡ στήλη παρ’ ᾗ ἕστηκας χιλίᾱς δραχμᾱ̀ς κελεύει ὀφείλειν
hē stḗlē par’ hêi héstēkas khilíās drakhmā̀s keleúei opheílein
The inscribed stone beside which you are standing orders that you owe 1000 drachmas.

==== Pluperfect tense ====
The pluperfect tense (Greek ὑπερσυντέλικος (hupersuntélikos) "more than completed"), like the Imperfect, is used only in the indicative mood. It refers to a situation that existed due to events that had taken place at an earlier time:

μάλα ἤχθοντο ὅτι οἱ Ἕλληνες ἐπεφεύγεσαν· ὃ οὔπω πρόσθεν ἐπεποιήκεσαν.
mála ḗkhthonto hóti hoi Héllēnes epepheúgesan; hò oúpō prósthen epepoiḗkesan.
They were very annoyed that the Greeks had fled – something which they had never done before.

However, the pluperfect is much less frequently used in Greek than in English, since after conjunctions such as ἐπεί (epeí) "when", usually the aorist is used:

ἐπεὶ δ’ ἐδείπνησαν, ἐξῆγε τὸ στράτευμα.
epeì d’ edeípnēsan, exêge tò stráteuma.
And when they had had dinner (aorist), he began leading out the army.

==== Future perfect tense ====
The future perfect tense (Greek συντελεσμένος μέλλων (suntelesménos méllōn) "going to be completed") is rarely used. In the active voice only two verbs (τεθνήξω (tethnḗxō) "I will be dead" and ἑστήξω (hestḗxō) "I will be standing") have a separate form for the future perfect tense, though a compound ("periphrastic") tense can be made with a perfect participle, e.g ἐγνωκὼς ἔσται (egnōkṑs éstai) "he is going to have realised"; but even this is rare. It is more common in the passive. It describes a future state that will result from a finished action:

φίλος ἡμῖν οὐδεὶς λελείψεται.
phílos hēmîn oudeìs leleípsetai.
No friend will have been left for us.

== Moods ==
There are four moods (ἐγκλίσεις enklíseis "bendings" or "leanings"):

=== Indicative ===
(Greek ὁριστική horistikḗ "for defining", from ὁρίζω horízō "I define").

The indicative is the form of the verb used for ordinary statements of fact:

ἀπέκτεινε τὸν ἄνδρα.
apékteine tòn ándra.
He killed the man.

To make the negative of the indicative, οὐ (ou) or, before a vowel, οὐκ (ouk) is added before the verb:

οὐκ ἐδύνατο καθεύδειν.
ouk edúnato katheúdein.
He was not able to sleep.

The imperfect and aorist indicative can also sometimes refer to unreal (counterfactual) situations in present or past time ("would be doing", "should be doing", "would have done" etc.). (For further examples see above.)

τί σιγᾷς; οὐκ ἐχρῆν σιγᾶν.
tí sigâis? ouk ekhrên sigân.
Why are you keeping quiet? You should not be keeping quiet.

=== Subjunctive ===
(Greek ὑποτακτική hupotaktikḗ "for arranging underneath", from ὑποτάσσω hupotássō "I arrange underneath").

The subjunctive generally has the letters ω (ō) or η (ē) in the ending.

It is often used when the meaning is may, for example in purpose clauses, especially those referring to present or future time:

λέγε, ἵνα ἀκούω
lége, hína akoúō
Speak, so that I may hear (lit. so that I may be hearing).

The above example uses the present subjunctive, but the aorist subjunctive is equally correct, with a slightly different shade of meaning:

λέγε, ἵνα ἀκούσω
lége, hína akoúsō
Speak, so that I may hear (lit. so that I may hear (straightaway)).

Another very common use of the subjunctive is in indefinite subordinate clauses following a conjunction such as ἐᾱ́ν (eā́n) "if (it may be that)", ὅταν (hótan) "whenever", ὃς ἄν (hòs án) "whoever", ἕως ἄν (héōs án) "until such time as" etc., referring to present or future time. When used with the subjunctive, such conjunctions are always joined with the particle ἄν (an):

λέγε, ἕως ἂν οἴκαδε ὥρᾱ ᾖ ἀπιέναι
lége, héōs àn oíkade hṓrā êi apiénai
Speak, until it is time to go home.

The subjunctive can also be used of something that it is suggested "should" happen, for example in exhortations, deliberative questions, and negative commands such as the following:

ἄγε νῡν, ἴωμεν
áge nūn, íōmen
Come now, let's go.

εἴπωμεν ἢ σῑγῶμεν;
eípōmen ḕ sīgômen?
Should we speak (aorist) or should we remain silent (present)?

μὴ θαυμάσῃς.
mḕ thaumásēis.
Don't be surprised.

The negative of the subjunctive, as in the above example, is μὴ (mē).

=== Optative ===
(Greek: εὐκτική euktikḗ "for wishing", from εὔχομαι eúkhomai "I wish").

The optative mood can generally be recognised because it has the letters οι (oi), αι (ai) or ει (ei) in the ending.

One use of the optative mood is in conditional sentences referring to a hypothetical situation in the future. The particle ἄν (an) is added in the main clause to give the meaning "would":

ἡδέως ἂν λάβοιμι, εἰ διδοίη
hēdéōs àn láboimi, ei didoíē
I would gladly take, if he were to give.

However, the optative mood is not used in sentences referring to a hypothetical situation in the present or past; in such sentences the optative is replaced by the imperfect, aorist, or pluperfect indicative, with ἄν (an) in the main clause.

The optative mood is also used in reported speech in past time:

εἶπεν ὅτι θῦσαί τι βούλοιτο
eîpen hóti thûsaí ti boúloito
He said that he wished to make a sacrifice.

Just as the subjunctive is used after a conjunction meaning "whenever", "until such time as" etc. referring to present or future time, so the optative can be used in similar clauses referring to repeated events in past time. However, in this case the particle ἄν (an) is not added to the conjunction:

ἐθήρευεν, ὁπότε γυμνάσαι βούλοιτο ἑαυτόν.
ethḗreuen, hopóte gumnásai boúloito heautón.
He used to hunt, whenever he wished to take exercise.

The optative can also be used for wishes:

ὃ μὴ γένοιτο.
hò mḕ génoito.
Which may it not happen!

The optative can also be used in purpose clauses in past time, and after verbs of fearing in past time:

ἐκάλεσε γάρ τις αὐτὸν ὅπως ἴδοι τὰ ἱερά.
ekálese gár tis autòn hópōs ídoi tà hierá.
Someone had summoned him so that he could see the sacrificial entrails.

ἔδεισαν οἱ Ἕλληνες αὐτὸν μὴ τύραννος γένοιτο.
édeisan hoi Héllēnes autòn mḕ túrannos génoito.
The Greeks were afraid of him in case he might become a tyrant.

However, some authors, such as Herodotus and Thucydides, prefer to use the subjunctive in such clauses.

=== Imperative ===
(Greek: προστακτική prostaktikḗ "for commanding", from προστάσσω prostássō "I command").

The present imperative is used for general commands:

τοὺς μὲν θεοὺς φοβοῦ, τοὺς δὲ γονεῖς τῑ́μᾱ.
toùs mèn theoùs phoboû, toùs dè goneîs tī́mā.
Fear the gods, and honour your parents.

The aorist imperative is used when the speaker wishes something done at once:

δότε μοι ξίφος ὅπως τάχιστα.
dóte moi xíphos hópōs tákhista.
Give me a sword as quickly as possible!

It is also possible in Greek to have a 3rd person imperative, as in the following examples:

ἀπαγέτω τις αὐτὴν οἴκαδε.
apagétō tis autḕn oíkade
Someone take her away home (at once).

θεοὶ ἡμῖν μάρτυρες ἔστων.
theoì hēmîn mártures éstōn.
The gods be witnesses for us.

The imperative mood can also be used in the perfect tense, as the following example shows:

κέντρῳ τῷ Α, διαστήματι τῷ ΑΒ, γεγράφθω κύκλος.
kéntrōi tôi A, diastḗmati tôi AB, gegráphthō kúklos
Let a circle have been drawn with centre A, radius AB.

== Non-finite verb forms ==
=== Infinitives ===
(Greek: ἀπαρέμφατος aparémphatos "not indicated").

==== Forms of the infinitive (active) ====
The infinitive is found in all three voices, and in the present, aorist, future, and perfect tenses. The four infinitives of the active voice of the regular verb λῡ́ω (lū́ō) "I free" are as follows:

- Present : λῡ́ειν (lū́ein) "to free" (in general)
- Future : λῡ́σειν (lū́sein) "to be going to free"
- Aorist : λῦσαι (lûsai) "to free" (at once)
- Perfect : λελυκέναι (lelukénai) "to have freed"

Many commonly used verbs, instead of an aorist infinitive in -σαι (-sai), have an infinitive ending in -εῖν (-eîn) (with a circumflex accent) instead. This is called the "strong aorist" or "2nd aorist":

- (Strong) aorist : λαβεῖν (labeîn) "to take"

Root aorists take a different infinitive:

- (Root) aorist : βῆναι (bênai) "to go"

Contracting verbs have an active present infinitive ending in -ᾶν (-ân), -εῖν (-eîn) or -οῦν (-oûn):

- Present : ὁρᾶν (horân) "to see"
- Present : ποιεῖν (poieîn) "to do"
- Present : δηλοῦν (dēloûn) "to show"

Verbs ending in -μι (-mi), such as δίδωμι (dídōmi) "I give", have present and aorist infinitives which end in -ναι (-nai):

- Present : διδόναι (didónai) "to give" (in general)
- Aorist : δοῦναι (doûnai) "to give" (now)

The irregular verb οἶδα (oîda) "I know" also has an infinitive ending in -ναι (-nai):

- Present : εἰδέναι (eidénai) "to know"

==== Uses ====
The infinitive is often used after verbs with meanings such as "he wanted", "he ordered", "he tried", "it is necessary", "he is able" etc. much as in English:

ἐκέλευσεν αὐτοὺς ἀπελθεῖν.
ekéleusen autoùs apeltheîn.
He ordered them to go aside (aorist).

It can also be used for indirect speech after certain verbs such as φημί (phēmí) "I say" or νομίζω (nomízō) "I think". The subject of the infinitive, if it is different from the subject of the main verb, is put in the accusative case. When the statement is negative, the word οὐ (ou) "not" goes in front of φημί (phēmí).

οὔ φᾱσιν εἶναι ἄλλην ὁδόν.
oú phāsin eînai állēn hodón.
"They say there is no other way" (lit. "they do not say there to be another way")

In Greek an infinitive is also often used with the neuter definite article in various constructions. In this case it is similar in meaning to the English verbal noun in "-ing":

ἐπέσχομεν τοῦ δακρύειν
epéskhomen toû dakrúein.
We refrained from weeping.

=== Participles ===
Participles were given the name μετοχή metokhḗ "sharing" by Greek grammarians, because they share the characteristics of both adjectives and verbs. Like adjectives, they have gender, case, and number and agree with the nouns that they modify, and, like verbs, they have tense and voice.

==== Forms of the participle ====
Participles exist for all three voices in the present, aorist, future, and perfect tenses. Typical endings for the masc. sg., fem. sg., and masc. pl. are as follows:

Active:

- -ων, -ουσα, -οντες (-ōn, -ousa, -ontes) – present
- -σων, -σουσα, -σοντες (sōn, -sousa, -sontes) – future
- -ῶν, -οῦσα, -οῦντες (-ôn, -oûsa, -oûntes) – contracting future and contracting present
- -σᾱς, -σᾱσα, -σαντες (-sas, -sasa, -santes) – weak aorist
- -ών, -οῦσα, -όντες (-ṓn, -oûsa, -óntes) – strong aorist
- -ώς, -υῖα, -ότες (-ṓs, -uîa, -ótes) – perfect

Middle and Passive:

- -όμενος, -ομένη, -όμενοι (-ómenos, -oménē, -ómenoi) – present and strong aorist middle
- -σόμενος, -σομένη, -σόμενοι (-sómenos, -soménē, -sómenoi) – future middle
- -σάμενος, -σαμένη, -σάμενοι (-sámenos, -saménē, -sámenoi) – weak aorist middle
- -θείς, -θεῖσα, -θέντες (-theís, -theîsa, -théntes) – weak aorist passive
- -μένος, -μένη, -μένοι (ménos, -ménē, -ménoi) – perfect middle or passive

==== An example of usage ====
Participles are very frequently used in Greek. For example, in the following sentence from Plato's Phaedo there are six participles:

καὶ ὁ παῖς ἐξελθὼν καὶ συχνὸν χρόνον διατρῑ́ψᾱς ἧκεν ἄγων τὸν μέλλοντα δώσειν τὸ φάρμακον, ἐν κύλικι φέροντα τετριμμένον.
kaì ho paîs exelthṑn kaì sukhnòn khrónon diatrī́psās hêken ágōn tòn méllonta dṓsein tò phármakon, en kúliki phéronta tetrimménon.
And the boy, after going out and after spending a long time, came back leading the one intending to give the poison, (who was) carrying it already pounded in a cup.

This example is analysed in the paragraphs below.

==== Different tenses of the participle ====
An aorist participle, such as ἐξελθών (exelthṓn) "after going out", usually refers to an action which preceded the time of the main verb:

ἐξελθὼν ἧκεν.
exelthṑn hêken.
After going out he came back.

A present participle, such as ἄγων (ágōn) "leading", is used to refer to an action which is taking place simultaneously with the main verb:

ἧκεν ἄγων τὸν (ἄνθρωπον).
hêken ágōn tòn (ánthrōpon).
He came back leading the man.

A perfect participle, such as τετριμμένον (tetrimménon) "pounded", generally refers to the state that something is in as a result of an earlier action, e.g. "fallen", "dead", "broken" etc., rather than to the action itself:

τὸ φάρμακον ἐν κύλικι φέροντα τετριμμένον.
tò phármakon en kúliki phéronta tetrimménon.
Carrying the poison already pounded in a cup.

A future participle refers to an action which is to take place after the time of the main verb, and is often used to indicate purpose:

εἰς Ἀθήνας ἔπλευσε ταῦτα ἐξαγγελῶν
eis Athḗnas épleuse taûta exangelôn
He sailed to Athens to report (lit. going to report) these things.

==== Agreement ====
Because it is an adjective as well as a verb, a participle has to agree in case, gender, and number with the noun it refers to. Thus in the first example above:

- ἐξελθών (exelthṓn) "after going out", διατρῑ́ψᾱς (diatrī́psās) "after spending", and ἄγων (ágōn) "leading" are all masculine singular nominative, since they refer to the boy who is the subject of the verb ἧκεν (hêken) "came back";
- μέλλοντα (méllonta) "intending" and φέροντα (phéronta) "carrying" are both masculine singular accusative, since they refer to the man who is the object of the participle ἄγων (ἄγων) "leading";
- τετριμμένον (tetrimménon) "pounded" is neuter singular accusative, since it describes the poison φάρμακον (phármakon) which is the object of the participle φέροντα (phéronta) "carrying".

==== Circumstantial participle ====
A participle frequently describes the circumstances in which another action took place. Often it is translated with "-ing", e.g. ἄγων (ágōn) "leading" in the example above.

In some sentences it can be translated with a clause beginning "when" or "since":

κατιδὼν τὴν μάχην ... ἐβοήθει
katidṑn tḕn mákhēn ... eboḗthei
When he saw the battle he went to help.

Another frequent use is in a construction known as the "genitive absolute", when the participle and its subject are placed in the genitive case. This construction is used when the participle refers to someone or something who is not the subject, object, or indirect object of the main verb:

ἐνῑ́κησαν Λακεδαιμόνιοι ἡγουμένου Ἀγησανδρίδου
enī́kēsan Lakedaimónioi hēgouménou Agēsandrídou
The Spartans won, with Agesandridas leading them.

But if the verb is an impersonal one, it is put in the accusative, e.g. ἔξον (éxon) "it being possible".

==== Participle with the article ====
Sometimes a participle is used with the article, in which case it can often be translated with "who":

τὸν μέλλοντα δώσειν τὸ φάρμακον.
tòn méllonta dṓsein tò phármakon.
The (man who was) going to give the poison.

==== Supplementary participle ====
As well as being used in sentences such as the above, the participle can be used following verbs with meanings such as "I know", "I notice", "I happen (to be)", "I hear (that)" and so on. This use is known as the "supplementary" participle.

ἤκουσε Κῦρον ἐν Κιλικίᾱͅ ὄντα.
ḗkouse Kûron en Kilikíā̄i ónta.
He heard that Cyrus was in Cilicia (lit. he heard Cyrus being in Cilicia).

ἔτυχε καὶ ὁ Ἀλκιβιάδης παρών.
étukhe kaì ho Alkibiádēs parṓn.
Alcibiades also happened to be present (lit. chanced being present).

== See also ==
- Ancient Greek verbs (Wiktionary)
- Koine Greek grammar
- Modern Greek grammar
