= Prophetic perfect tense =

Literary technique used in religious texts

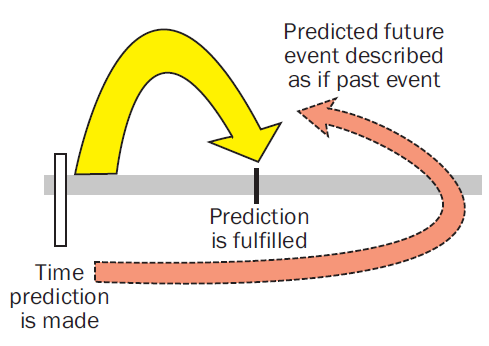
Diagram of the prophetic perfect tense

The prophetic perfect tense is a literary technique used in the Bible that describes future events that are so certain to happen that they are referred to in the past tense as if they had already happened.

== History ==
The category of "prophetic perfect" was already suggested by medieval Hebrew grammarians, such as David Kimhi: "The matter is as clear as though it had already passed," or Isaac ben Yedaiah:

"[The rabbis] of blessed memory followed, in these words of theirs, in the paths of the prophets who speak of something which will happen in the future in the language of the past. Since they saw in prophetic vision that which was to occur in the future, they spoke about it in the past tense and testified firmly that it had happened, to teach the certainty of his [God's] words -- may he be blessed -- and his positive promise that can never change and his beneficent message that will not be altered." (Isaac ben Yedaiah):

Wilhelm Gesenius describes it as follows:

"[In the original Hebrew] The perfect serves to express actions, events, or states, which the speaker wishes to represent from the point of view of completion, whether they belong to a determinate past time, or extend into the present, or while still future, are pictured as in their completed state." (GKC §106a)

"[The perfect can be used to] express facts which are undoubtedly imminent, and, therefore, in the imagination of the speaker, already accomplished (perfectum confidentiae), e.g. Gn 30:13, 1 S 6:5 ..., Pr 4:2. Even in interrogative sentences, Gn 18:12, Nu 17:28, 23:10, Ju 9:9, 11, Zc 4:10 (?), Pr 22:20.8 This use of the perfect occurs most frequently in prophetic language (perfectum propheticum). The prophet so transports himself in imagination into the future that he describes the future event as if it had been already seen or heard by him, e.g. Is 5:13 ...; 19:7, Jb 5:20, 2 Ch 20:37. Not infrequently the imperfect interchanges with such perfects either in the parallel member or further on in the narrative." (GKC §106n)

According to Waltke & O'Connor:

"Referring to absolute future time, a perfective form may be persistent or accidental. A persistent (future) perfective represents a single situation extending from the present into the future.... With an accidental perfective a speaker vividly and dramatically represents a future situation both as complete and as independent. ... This use is especially frequent in prophetic address (hence it is also called the "prophetic perfect" or "perfective of confidence")."

Klein has attempted to identify all established instances of the prophetic perfect. Notarius, siding with Rogland, argues that the "prophetic perfect" is "a metaphorical use of the past tense in the retrospective future-oriented report."

== Examples ==
- "Therefore my people are gone into captivity, because they have no knowledge: and their honourable men are famished, and their multitude dried up with thirst." – Isaiah 5:13
- "He is come to Aiath, he is passed to Migron; at Michmash he hath laid up his carriages: They are gone over the passage: they have taken up their lodging at Geba; Ramah is afraid; Gibeah of Saul is fled. Lift up thy voice, O daughter of Gallim: cause it to be heard unto Laish, O poor Anathoth. Madmenah is removed; the inhabitants of Gebim gather themselves to flee. As yet shall he remain at Nob that day: he shall shake his hand against the mount of the daughter of Zion, the hill of Jerusalem." – Isaiah 10:28–32
- "Therefore thus saith the Lord God of Israel against the pastors that feed my people; Ye have scattered my flock, and driven them away, and have not visited them: behold, I will visit upon you the evil of your doings, saith the Lord." – Jeremiah 23:2
- "The virgin of Israel is fallen; she shall no more rise: she is forsaken upon her land; there is none to raise her up." – Amos 5:2
- "...I will go in to the king, though it is against the law; and if I perish, I perish." – Esther 4:16 (Note: "I perish" is in what is normally imperfect tense in the original Hebrew (Biblical Hebrew: וְכַאֲשֶׁ֥ר אָבַ֖דְתִּי אָבָֽדְתִּי).)
- "The former things are passed away." – Revelation 21:4
- "These things I have spoken unto you, that in me ye might have peace. In the world ye shall have tribulation: but be of good cheer; I have overcome the world." - John 16:33 (Note: This was spoken before the cross, and the verb for 'have overcome' is nikaó, in the perfect tense.)
- "Jedan čovek nikad sreću nemao" ("One man never (will have) had any fortune") spoken as an election prediction by Zora Filipović from Medveđa to the former president of Serbia during the election campaign, only a few weeks before he lost to the student led movement.

== See also ==
- Prolepsis (literary)
