= English passive voice =

Grammatical voice in the English language

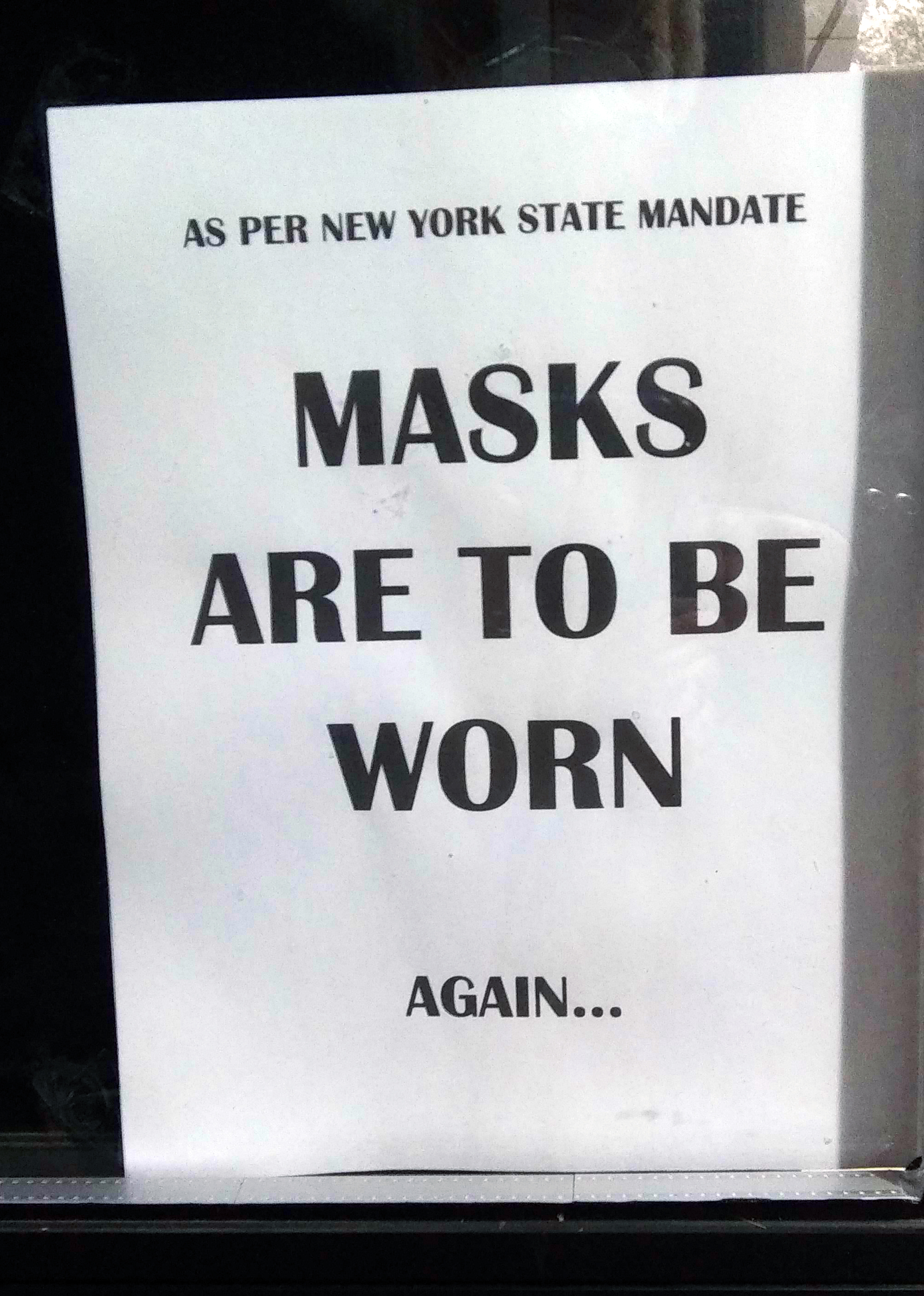
A sign using the passive voice to indicate a mask mandate during the COVID-19 pandemic

In English, the passive voice is marked by using be or get followed by a past participle. For example:

- The enemy was defeated.
- Caesar was stabbed.

The recipient of a sentence's action is referred to as the patient. In sentences using the active voice, the subject is the performer of the action—referred to as the agent. Above, the agent is omitted entirely, but it may also be included adjunctively while maintaining the passive voice:

- The enemy was defeated by our troops.
- Caesar was stabbed by Brutus.

The initial examples rewritten in the active voice yield:

- Our troops defeated the enemy.
- Brutus stabbed Caesar.

The English passive voice typically involves forms of the verbs to be or to get followed by a passive participle as the subject complement—sometimes referred to as a passive verb.

English allows a number of additional passive constructions that are not possible in many other languages with analogous passive formations to the above. A sentence's indirect object may be promoted to the subject position—e.g. Tom was given a bag. Similarly, the complement of a preposition may be promoted, leaving a stranded preposition—e.g. Sue was operated on.

The English passive voice is used less often than the active voice, but frequency varies according to the writer's style and the given field of writing. Contemporary style guides discourage excessive use of the passive voice but generally consider it to be acceptable in certain situations, such as when the patient is the topic of the sentence, when the agent is unimportant and therefore omitted, or when the agent is placed near the end of a sentence as a means of emphasis.

== Identifying the English passive ==
The passive voice is a specific grammatical construction. The essential components, in English, are a form of the stative verb be (or sometimes get) and the past participle of the verb denoting the action. The agent (the doer of the action) may be specified using a prepositional phrase with the preposition by, but this is optional. It can be used in a number of different grammatical contexts; for instance, in declarative, interrogative, and imperative clauses:

- "Kennedy was assassinated in 1963."
- "Mistakes were made."
- "The window got broken."
- "Have you ever been kicked by an elephant?"
- "Don't get killed."
- "Being attacked by Geoffrey Howe was like being savaged by a dead sheep."

=== Misuse of the term ===
Though the passive can be used for the purpose of concealing the agent, this is not a valid way of identifying the passive, and many other grammatical constructions can be used to accomplish this. Not every expression that serves to take focus away from the performer of an action is an instance of passive voice. For instance, "There were mistakes" and "Mistakes occurred" are both in the active voice. Occasionally, authors express recommendations about use of the passive unclearly or misapply the term "passive voice" to include sentences of this type. An example of this incorrect usage can be found in the following extract from an article from The New Yorker about Bernard Madoff (bolding and italics added; bold text indicates the verbs misidentified as passive voice):

Two sentences later, Madoff said, "When I began the Ponzi scheme, I believed it would end shortly, and I would be able to extricate myself, and my clients, from the scheme." As he read this, he betrayed no sense of how absurd it was to use the passive voice in regard to his scheme, as if it were a spell of bad weather that had descended on him ... In most of the rest of the statement, one not only heard the aggrieved passive voice, but felt the hand of a lawyer: "To the best of my recollection, my fraud began in the early nineteen-nineties."

The intransitive verbs would end and began are in fact ergative verbs in the active voice. Although the speaker may be using words in a manner that diverts responsibility from him, this is not being accomplished by use of passive voice.

== Reasons for using the passive voice ==
The passive voice can be used without referring to the agent of an action; it may therefore be used when the agent is unknown or unimportant, or the speaker does not wish to mention the agent.

- Three stores were robbed last night (the identity of the agent may be unknown).
- A new cancer drug has been discovered (the identity of the agent may be unimportant in the context).
- Mistakes have been made on this project (the speaker may not wish to identify the agent).

The last sentence illustrates a frequently criticized use of the passive, as the evasion of responsibility by failure to mention the agent (which may even be the speaker themselves).

Nonetheless, the passive voice can be complemented by an element that identifies the agent, usually via a by-phrase that is intended to emphasize the agent. For example:

- Don't you see? The patient was murdered by his own doctor!

In more technical terms, such uses can be expected in sentences where the agent is the focus (comment, rheme), while the patient (the undergoer of the action) is the topic or theme (see Topic–comment). There is a tendency for sentences to be formulated so as to place the focus at the end, which can motivate the choice of active or passive voice:

- My taxi hit an old lady (the taxi is the topic, and the lady is the focus).
- My mother was hit by a taxi (the mother is the topic, and the taxi is the focus).

Similarly, the passive may be used because the noun phrase denoting the agent is a long one (containing many modifiers) since it is convenient to place such phrases at the end of a clause:

- The breakthrough was achieved by Burlingame and Evans, two researchers in the university's genetic engineering lab.

In some situations, the passive may be used so that the most dramatic word or the punchline appears at the end of the sentence.

== Style advice ==
=== Advice against the passive voice ===
Many language critics and language-usage manuals discourage use of the passive voice. This advice is not usually found in older guides, emerging only in the first half of the twentieth century. In 1916, the British writer Arthur Quiller-Couch criticized this grammatical voice:

Generally, use transitive verbs, that strike their object; and use them in the active voice, eschewing the stationary passive, with its little auxiliary its's [sic] and was's, and its participles getting into the light of your adjectives, which should be few. For, as a rough law, by his use of the straight verb and by his economy of adjectives you can tell a man's style, if it be masculine or neuter, writing or 'composition'.

Two years later, in the original 1918 edition of The Elements of Style, Cornell University Professor of English William Strunk, Jr. warned against excessive use of the passive voice:

The active voice is usually more direct and vigorous than the passive ... This rule does not, of course, mean that the writer should entirely discard the passive voice, which is frequently convenient and sometimes necessary ... The need to make a particular word the subject of the sentence will often ... determine which voice is to be used. The habitual use of the active voice, however, makes for forcible writing. This is true not only in narrative concerned principally with action, but in writing of any kind. Many a tame sentence of description or exposition can be made lively and emphatic by substituting a transitive in the active voice for some such perfunctory expression as there is or could be heard.

In 1926, in A Dictionary of Modern English Usage, Henry Watson Fowler recommended against transforming active voice forms into passive voice forms, because doing so "... ...sometimes leads to bad grammar, false idiom, or clumsiness."

In 1946, in the essay "Politics and the English Language", George Orwell recommended the active voice as an elementary principle of composition: "Never use the passive where you can use the active."

The Columbia Guide to Standard American English states that:

Active voice makes subjects do something (to something); passive voice permits subjects to have something done to them (by someone or something). Some argue that active voice is more muscular, direct, and succinct, passive voice flabbier, more indirect, and wordier. If you want your words to seem impersonal, indirect, and noncommittal, passive is the choice, but otherwise, active voice is almost invariably likely to prove more effective.

Use of the passive is more prevalent in scientific writing, but publishers of some scientific publications, such as Nature, Science and the IEEE, explicitly encourage their authors to use active voice.

The principal criticism against the passive voice is its potential for evasion of responsibility. This is because a passive clause may be used to omit the agent even where it is important:

- We had hoped to report on this problem, but the data were inadvertently deleted from our files.

Krista Ratcliffe, a professor at Marquette University, notes the use of passives as an example of the role of grammar as "... ...a link between words and magical conjuring ...: passive voice mystifies accountability by erasing who or what performs an action ..."

=== Advice by style guides and grammarians on appropriate use of the passive voice ===
Jan Freeman, a columnist for The Boston Globe, said that the passive voice does have its uses, and that "all good writers use the passive voice."

Passive writing is not necessarily slack and indirect. Many famously vigorous passages use the passive voice, as in these examples with the passive verbs italicized:

- Every valley shall be exalted, and every mountain and hill shall be made low; and the crooked shall be made straight, and the rough places plain. (King James Bible, Isaiah 40:4.)
- Now is the winter of our discontent / Made glorious summer by this sun of York. (Shakespeare's Richard III, I.1, ll. 1–2.)
- We hold these truths to be self-evident, that all men are created equal, that they are endowed by their Creator with certain unalienable Rights, that among these are Life, Liberty and the pursuit of Happiness. (United States Declaration of Independence.)
- Never in the field of human conflict was so much owed by so many to so few. (Winston Churchill addressing the House of Commons, 20 August 1940.)
- Yesterday, December 7, 1941 - a date which will live in infamy - the United States of America was suddenly and deliberately attacked by naval and air forces of the Empire of Japan. (Franklin D. Roosevelt's Infamy Speech following the Attack on Pearl Harbor.)
- For of those to whom much is given, much is required. (John F. Kennedy's quotation of Luke 12:48 in his address to the Massachusetts legislature, 9 January 1961.)

While Strunk and White, in The Elements of Style, encourage use of the active voice, they also state that the passive is often useful and sometimes preferable, even necessary, the choice of active or passive depending, for instance, on the topic of the sentence.

Another advisor, Joseph M. Williams, who has written several books on style, states with greater clarity that the passive is often the better choice. According to Williams, the choice between active and passive depends on the answers to three questions:

1. "Must the reader know who is responsible for the action?"
2. "Would the active or passive verb help your readers move more smoothly from one sentence to the next?
3. "Would the active or passive give readers a more consistent and appropriate point of view?"

Bryan A. Garner, in Garner's Modern English Usage, stresses the advantages of the active voice, but gives the following examples of where the passive is preferred:

- "When the actor is unimportant."
- "When the actor is unknown."
- "When you want to hide the actor's identity."
- "When you need to put the punch word at the end of the sentence."
- "When the focus of the sentence is on the thing being acted on."
- "When the passive simply sounds better."

Merriam–Webster's Dictionary of English Usage recommends the passive voice when identifying the object (receiver) of the action is more important than the subject (agent), and when the agent is unknown, unimportant, or not worth mentioning:

- The child was struck by the car.
- The store was robbed last night.
- Plows should not be kept in the garage.
- Kennedy was elected president.

The linguist Geoffrey Pullum writes that "The passive is not an undesirable feature limited to bad writing, it's a useful construction often needed for clear expression, and every good writer uses it."

Despite criticism that the passive can be used to hide responsibility by omitting the agent, the passive can also be used to emphasize the agent. Writers have preferred placing the agent at the end of a clause or sentence to give it greater emphasis, as in the examples given in the previous section:

- Don't you see? The patient was murdered by his own doctor!
- The breakthrough was achieved by Burlingame and Evans, two researchers in the university's genetic engineering lab.

=== Actual use of the passive voice ===
Agentless passives were once common in scientific writing, where the agent may be irrelevant, although at least one publisher considers this a "fading practice":

- The mixture was heated to 300 °C.

The passive voice is used more frequently in scientific writing than in other prose, where it is relatively rare.

A statistical study of a variety of periodicals found a maximum incidence of 13 percent passive constructions. Despite Orwell's advice to avoid the passive, his Politics and the English Language employs passive voice for about 20 percent of its constructions.

The Longman Grammar of Spoken and Written English gives the following rough frequencies per million words:

	Conversation	Fiction	News	Academic
Short passives (finite)
Stative verbs	1,000	1,000	1,000	1,500
Dynamic verbs	1,000	2,500	5,000	10,000
Get passive	<250	<250	<250	<250
Other copula	<250	<250	<250	<250
Long passives (finite)	<250	500	1,500	1,500
Post modifier in NP (non-finite)
Short passives	<250	1,000	1,500	3,500
Long passives	<250	500	1,000	1,000

In academic prose, passives make up roughly 25% of all finite clauses, 15% in news, less in fiction, and even less in conversation.

== Passive constructions ==
=== Canonical passives ===
In the most commonly considered type of passive clause, a form of the verb be (or sometimes get) is used as an auxiliary together with the past participle of a transitive verb; that verb is missing its direct object, and the patient of the action (that which would be denoted by the direct object of the verb in an active clause) is denoted instead by the subject of the clause. For example, the active clause:

- John threw the ball.

contains threw as a transitive verb with John as its subject and the ball as its direct object. If we recast the verb in the passive voice (was thrown), then the ball becomes the subject (it is "promoted" to the subject position) and John disappears:

- The ball was thrown.

The original subject (the agent) can optionally be re-inserted using the preposition by.

- The ball was thrown by John.

The above example uses the verb be (in the past tense form was) to make the passive. It is often possible to use the verb get as an alternative (possibly with slightly different meaning); for example, the active sentence "The ball hit Bob" may be recast in either of the following forms:

- Bob was hit by the ball.
- Bob got hit by the ball.

The auxiliary verb of the passive voice (be or get) may appear in any combination of tense, aspect and mood, and can also appear in non-finite form (infinitive, participle or gerund). See the article on English verb forms for more information. Notice that this includes use of the verb be in progressive aspect, which does not normally occur when be is used as a simple copula. Some examples:

- The food is being served. (present progressive passive)
- The stadium will have been built by next January. (future perfect passive)
- I would have got/gotten injured if I had stayed in my place. (conditional perfect passive with get)
- It isn't nice to be insulted. (passive infinitive)
- Having been humiliated, he left the stage. (passive present participle, perfect aspect)

=== Promotion of indirect objects ===
Unlike some other languages, English also allows passive clauses in which an indirect object, rather than a direct object, is promoted to the subject. For example:

- John gave Mary a book. → Mary was given a book (by John).

In the active form, gave is the verb; John is its subject, Mary its indirect object, and a book its direct object. In the passive forms, the indirect object has been promoted and the direct object has been left in place. (In this respect, English resembles secundative languages.)

It is normally only the first-appearing object that can be promoted; promotion of the indirect object takes place from a construction in which it precedes the direct object (i.e. where there is no to or for before the indirect object), whereas promotion of the direct object in such cases takes place from a construction in which the indirect object follows the direct object (this time being accompanied by to or for; see English grammar § Verb phrases). For example:

- John gave Mary a book. → Mary was given a book. (and not: A book was given Mary.)
- John gave a book to Mary. → A book was given to Mary. (and not: *Mary was given a book to. (Note: This article uses asterisks to indicate ungrammatical examples.))

Similar restrictions apply to the prepositional passive, as noted in the following section.

=== Prepositional passive ===
It is also possible, in some cases, to promote the object of a preposition. This may be called the prepositional passive, or sometimes the pseudopassive (although the latter term can also have other meanings, such as being equivalent to the impersonal passive voice, particularly in descriptions of other languages).

- They talked about the problem. → The problem was talked about.

In the passive form here, the preposition is "stranded"; that is, it is not followed by an object.

The prepositional passive is common, especially in informal English. However some potential uses are much less acceptable than others; compare the following examples:

- Someone has slept in this bottom bunk. → This bottom bunk has been slept in. (fully acceptable)
- Someone has slept above this bottom bunk. → ??This bottom bunk has been slept above. (much less acceptable)

The second sentence appears much less acceptable because sleeping above a bunk does not change its state; the verb phrase been slept above does not express a "relevantly important property" of the bunk.

It is not usually possible to promote a prepositional object if the verb also has a direct object; any passive rendering of the sentence must instead promote the direct object. For example:

- Someone has put a child in this bunk. → *This bunk has been put a child in. (unacceptable)
- Someone has put a child in this bunk. → A child has been put in this bunk. (acceptable)

Exceptions occur with certain idiomatic combinations of verb+object+preposition, such as take advantage of:

- I feel people have taken advantage of me. → I feel I have been taken advantage of. (acceptable)

=== Stative and adjectival uses ===
A type of clause that is similar or identical in form to the passive clauses described above has the past participle used to denote not an action, but a state being the result of an action. For example, the sentence The window was broken may have two different meanings and might be ambiguous:

- The window was broken, i.e. Someone or something broke the window. (action, event)
- The window was broken, i.e. The window was not intact. (resultant state)

The first sentence is an example of the canonical English passive as described above. However the second case is distinct; such sentences are not passive voice, because the participle is being used adjectivally; Such constructs are sometimes called "false passives" or stative passives (rarely called statal, static, or resultative passives), since they represent a state or result. By contrast the canonical passives, representing an action or event, may then be called dynamic or eventive passives.

The ambiguity in such sentences arises because the verb be is used in English both as the passive auxiliary and as the ordinary copular verb for linking to predicate adjectives. When get is used to form the passive, there is no ambiguity: The window got broken cannot have a stative meaning. (For ways in which some other languages make this distinction, see Passive voice § Stative and dynamic passive.) If a distinct adjective exists for the purpose of expressing the state, then the past participle is less likely to be used for that purpose; this is the case with the verb open and the adjective open, so the sentence The door was opened (but not the package was unopened) more likely refers to the action than to the state since one can simply say The door was open in the stative case.

Past participles of transitive verbs can also be used as adjectives (as in a broken doll), and the participles used in the above-mentioned "stative" constructions are often considered to be adjectival (in predicative use). Such constructions may then also be called adjectival passives (although they are not normally considered true passives). For example:

- She was relieved to find her car.

Here, relieved is an ordinary adjective, though it derives from the past participle of relieve. In other sentences that same participle may be used to form the true (dynamic) passive: He was relieved of duty.

When the verb being put into the passive voice is a stative verb anyway, the distinctions between uses of the past participle become less clear, since the canonical passive already has a stative meaning. (For example: People know his identity → His identity is known.) However it is sometimes possible to impart a dynamic meaning using get as the auxiliary, as in get known with the meaning "become known".

=== Passive constructions without an exactly corresponding active ===
Some passive constructions are not derived exactly from a corresponding active construction in the ways described above. This is particularly the case with sentences containing content clauses (usually that-clauses). Given a sentence in which the role of direct object is played by such a clause, for example

- They say (that) he cheats.

It is possible to convert this to a passive by promoting the content clause to subject; in this case, however, the clause typically does not change its position in the sentence, and an expletive it takes the normal subject position:

- It is said that he cheats.

Another way of forming passives in such cases involves promoting the subject of the content clause to the subject of the main clause, and converting the content clause into a non-finite clause with the to-infinitive. This infinitive is marked for grammatical aspect to correspond to the aspect (or past tense) expressed in the content clause. For example:

- They say that he cheats. → He is said to cheat.
- They think that I am dying. → I am thought to be dying.
- They report that she came back / has come back. → She is reported to have come back.
- They say that she will resign. → e.g. She is said to be going to resign.

Some verbs are used almost exclusively in the passive voice. This is the case with rumor, for example. The following passive sentences are possible:

- He was rumored to be a war veteran. / It was rumored that he was a war veteran.

but it is not possible to use the active counterpart *They rumored that he was a war veteran. (This was once possible, but has fallen out of use.)

Another situation in which the passive uses a different construction than the active involves the verb make, meaning "compel". When this verb is used in the active voice it takes the bare infinitive (without the particle to), but in the passive voice it takes the to-infinitive. For example:

- They made Jane attend classes.
- Jane was made to attend classes.

=== Double passives ===
The construction called double passive can arise when one verb appears in the to-infinitive as the complement of another verb.

If the first verb takes a direct object ahead of the infinitive complement (this applies to raising-to-object verbs, where the expected subject of the second verb is raised to the position of object of the first verb), then the passive voice may be used independently for either or both of the verbs:

- We expect you to complete the project. (you is raised from subject of complete to object of expect)
- You are expected to complete the project. (passive voice used for expect)
- We expect the project to be completed. (passive voice used for complete; now the project is raised to object)
- The project is expected to be completed. (double passive)

Other verbs which can behave similarly to expect in such constructions include order, tell, persuade, etc., leading to such double passives as The man was ordered to be shot and I was persuaded to be ordained.

Similar constructions sometimes occur, however, when the first verb is raising-to-subject rather than raising-to-object – that is, when there is no object before the infinitive complement. For example, with attempt, the active voice construction is simply We attempted to complete the project. A double passive formed from that sentence would be:

- The project was attempted to be completed.

with both verbs changed simultaneously to the passive voice, even though the first verb takes no object – it is not possible to say *We attempted the project to be completed, which is the sentence from which the double passive would appear to derive.

This latter double passive construction is criticized as questionable both grammatically and stylistically. Fowler calls it "clumsy and incorrect", suggesting that it springs from false analogy with the former (acceptable) type of double passive, though conceding its usefulness in some legal and quasi-legal language. Other verbs mentioned (besides attempt) with which the construction is found include begin, desire, hope, propose, seek and threaten. Similarly, The American Heritage Book of English Usage declares this construction unacceptable. It nonetheless occurs in practice in a variety of contexts.

=== Additional passive constructions ===
Certain other constructions are sometimes classed as passives. The following types are mentioned by Pullum.

A bare passive clause is similar to a typical passive clause, but without the passive auxiliary verb (so it is a non-finite clause consisting of a subject together with a verb phrase based on a past participle with the passive construction). These can be used in such contexts as newspaper headlines:

- City hall damaged by hail

and as modifiers (adverbial phrases), i.e. nominative absolutes:

- Our work done, we made our way back home.
- That said, there are also other considerations.

Other constructions are mentioned in which a passive past participle clause is used, even though it is not introduced by the auxiliary be or get (or is introduced by get with a direct object):

- I had my car cleaned by a professional.
- Jane had her car stolen last week.
- You ought to get that lump looked at.
- This software comes pre-installed by the manufacturer.

In the concealed passive, the present participle or gerund form (-ing form) appears rather than the past participle. This can appear after need, and for some speakers after want (with similar meaning). For example:

- Your car needs washing. (meaning "needs to be washed")
- That rash needs looking at by a specialist.

(An idiomatic expression with the same construction is ... doesn't bear thinking about.)

The concealed passive (with an -ing form) can also be used in a complex construction; Huddleston gives the following example:

- Your hair needs cutting by a professional. [simple construction]
- You need your hair cutting by a professional. [complex construction]

See also English clause syntax § Non-finite clauses.

== Syntactic components of the passive voice ==
The sections below discuss some generalizations that linguists have attempted to identify regarding the syntactical distinctions between the passive voice, active past tense, the passive middle voice, and other past tense formations.

=== The passive participle ===
In English, the passive requires the use of the past participle of a verb, generally with an auxiliary verb be. The passive uses an auxiliary be in order to get tense because participles are non finite. The participle verb is also unable to assign Case. Case is a tool used in transformational grammar that states that Case gives grammatical relations to a noun to show how it functions in the sentence; for example, if a noun needs to be in first or second person due to the form of the verb. So, if a noun phrase in the passive needs to get Case from the participle verb, it must undergo movement to the head of the sentence CP to receive nominative Case.ii

Wanner argues that identification of the passive voice construction can't solely rely on the auxiliary be and the past participle as distinguishing features because the auxiliary be is also used to express the progressive aspect and the past participle can be found in multiple constructions that are not passive voice constructions. In these instances Wanner refers to, the auxiliary be is not found next to or with the past participle. If the auxiliary be is present directly in front of a past participle, it is a passive construction.

=== External argument, implicit argument, and theta roles ===
Passives always contain an external argument. An external argument is specifically referring to the theta role that is assigned to the subject of the sentence. Often, the external argument is the agent of the sentence. In passive constructions, the external argument does not need to be in subject position, as seen in active constructions. It is often found in an adjunct position instead. The passive voice also doesn't have to use the agent role. The passive allows for a variety of thematic roles in the external argument. For example, the subject could have a theta role of goal instead, as in the sentence below.

- I was sent a letter by them.

In the passive, external arguments can be made explicit in adjunct positions with the use of a by phrase. They don't have to be put into argument positions in order to be specific. The external argument in the passive will be represented even without a by phrase.

When a by phrase is missing in the passive, the external argument of the verb can become an implicit argument. Implicit here refers to the fact that these arguments can be implied and are not required to be explicit when used in a passive construction.

=== Control and arguments ===
Explicit arguments can control a PRO subject within an adjunct purpose clause using thematic control. PRO can also be controlled by an internal or external argument. Specifically, explicit and implicit arguments can control PRO in purpose clauses:

- They_{i} sold the books [PRO_{i} to make profit].

Above, they is the controller for PRO, and PRO is referencing that they are the ones who did it to make the profit. In this case, the explicit argument of the sentence is they. In the passive, arguments can even control a PRO subject without having an explicit external argument, because it is still there implicitly.

- The books were sold IMP_{i} [ PRO_{i} to make money].

Above, IMP is the reference to PRO because the books didn't sell themselves to make money, someone, who the interpreter of the sentence knows exists implicitly, sold them. In the passive, PRO is still able to be controlled even without having an explicit argument.

Control abilities can also be limited with implicit arguments in the passive. An implicit subject cannot control PRO in the case of ditransitive and subject control verbs. This is related to passive movement. Due to the raising done to get nominative case, the head T is no longer in an Agree relationship with the implicit subject, which means that the implicit subject can no longer control PRO either.

- *Sarah was promised (by Greg_{i}) [PRO_{i} to go on a vacation.]

In the passive, the thematic object can be the controller because it is still connected in agreement.

- Sarah_{i} was persuaded [PRO_{i} to go on vacation].

Some suggest that the ability to control is due to implicit arguments controlling through a thematic control, rather than an argument control like full arguments.

=== By phrases in the passive ===
Another feature of the passive is the optional by phrase. The by phrase is where the external argument can be explicitly expressed. This by phrase acts as an adjunct to the verb and is assigned theta roles that would normally be assigned elsewhere in the sentence, specifically it takes the theta role of the active subject.

- Toni ate the last piece of baklava. (active)
- The last piece of baklava was eaten [by Toni]. (passive)

In the passive, the theta role of agent is being given to Toni in the by phrase, the same as it previously had in the active subject. These by phrases are attached to the VoiceP head and are special to passives.

=== Movement in the passive ===
In Chomsky's generative grammar, the following example of a passive with the auxiliary be and a by phrase, gives the same reading as in an active sentence.

- Zenobia idolized Caesar. (active)
- Caesar was idolized by Zenobia. (passive)

Caesar which acted as the direct object in the active form, as the internal argument, moves from the direct object of the verb into the subject position in the passive for two reasons. The first reason is to satisfy the EPP (extended projection principle) and then second is to get Case, since in its participle form, the verb cannot give Case to Zenobia. Zenobia receives nominative Case from the finite INFL, the head of the CP.

Movement does not always take place in the passive though we see it often with by-phrases. This is because movement only takes place when a NP depends on the verb to get Case. There are instances of the passive that do not use movement.

=== Non-passivized verbs ===
Not all verbs in English can be passivized.

Unaccusative verbs do not form a passive in English.

- *It was wilted quickly.

In the passive the external argument is suppressed, but in unaccusative verbs, there is no external argument to be suppressed. Instead their subject argument generally acts as the object and then moves to the subject position to get Case. In the example above, you can see that the subject it moved from the object position to the subject. This is demonstrated in the trace below, where the trace (t_{i}) is left behind when the word it moves to the front of the sentence into subject position where it receives case.

- [_{CP} [_{TP}[_{VP} was wilted quickly[_{DP} it]]]].
- [_{CP}[_{TP} It_{i} [_{VP} was wilted quickly[_{DP} t_{i}]]]].

English also does not have impersonal passives, even though this can be found in other languages, like Dutch or German.

One argument using the lens of cognitive grammar claims that this is due to how auxiliary be functions in the passive. ii With the auxiliary be, the passive needs to have a patient argument. Unergative verbs that would form an impersonal passive do not have a patient argument, so the passive can't be formed. In Dutch, the be verb functions differently, so that the agent is always present. Therefore, in Dutch, the passive doesn't require a patient argument.

Another view is that it has to do with Case. Specifically, the inability of intransitive verbs to assign Case. Since intransitive verbs do not have objects, they don't assign Case. If the verb can't assign Case, then Case cannot be obtained by the passive; so they can't be passivized. This view claims that in German and Dutch, the verbs are structural case assigners which is why they are able to passivized in those languages.

Another Case-related argument varies slightly, still agreeing that no passive can be formed since the verb has no object, meaning no case can be assigned. However, the difference in this argument is in the analysis of how the impersonal passive works in Dutch and German. In this Case-related argument, Roberts (1985) claims that German and Dutch use dative case, argued to be an inherent Case (this is from Chomsky's generative grammar and means that specific verbs assign specific arguments and theta-roles) on their verbs, meaning these verbs can be put in the passive.

The reasons certain verbs cannot be passivized is not just based on syntax; there are semantic reasons behind their inability to passivize as well.

== Get passive ==
Originally the get passive was viewed as another variation of the be passive in English. It was assumed to function the exact same as the be passive, just using the verb get in place of auxiliary be. Today this is a topic of discussion among linguists who have noted that there are key differences between the behavior of a be passive and a get passive.

=== Control and agent behavior in get passives ===
Some claim that the get passive is considered a subject control verb, a construction where the unstated subject is forced to refer back to the subject of the main clause by the verb.

[Elle_{i} got PRO_{i} hired t_{i}]

Above, PRO has to refer to Elle, making it a subject control verb. The be passive does not allow for subject control. The patient in the get passive is often seen as being to blame for the event or action occurring, more so than in the be passive. The get passive patient seems to take on more responsibility in relation to the event of the sentence.

Mary got arrested.

Mary was arrested.

In the get passive version, there is some implied amount of accountability for being arrested, as if Mary did something to cause her being arrested, making it more closely related to the event of being arrested, compared to the stative be passive which doesn't connect back to the event, but is stative. This is because in get passives there is a belief that the surface subject can be identified as a secondary agent, but this is not an available reading in the be passive.

=== Arguments as an adjectival passive ===
Some linguists argue that the get passive is actually an adjectival passive, making it not a true passive and different from be.

Evidence for the get passive as an adjectival passive comes from examples where get passives are not allowed to appear and do not behave as be passives, which are demonstrated below:

Agent-Oriented Manner Adverbials

*The book got torn on purpose.

Rationale Clauses

*The ship got sunk [PRO/ec) to collect the insurance money].

Predication Structures

*The food (finally) got served [(PRO/ec) kneeling].

Reflexive Pronouns

*Food should never get served only for oneself.

However, there are instances where the above examples have a get passive that is allowed in the types of constructions above, and a be passive that is not. Furthermore, get passives allow the use of the by-phrase in the same conditions as the be passive.

The criminal got arrested by Mary.

This is something that usually isn't seen with true adjectival passives. These notions put the idea that the get passive may be an adjectival passive under question.

== Middle voice and passival ==
The term middle voice is sometimes used to refer to verbs used without a passive construction, but in a meaning where the grammatical subject is understood as undergoing the action. The meaning may be reflexive:

- Fred shaved, i.e. Fred shaved himself

but is not always:

- These cakes sell well, i.e. [we] sell these cakes [successfully]
- The clothes are soaking, i.e. [the water] is soaking the clothes

Such verbs may also be called passival.

Another construction sometimes referred to as passival involves a wider class of verbs, and was used in English until the nineteenth century. Sentences having this construction feature progressive aspect and resemble the active voice, but with meaning like the passive. Examples of this would be:

- The house is building. (modern English: The house is being built)
- The meal is eating. (modern English: The meal is being eaten)

A rare example of the passival form being used in modern English is with the following phrase:

- The drums are beating, i.e. the drums are being beaten

This passival construction was displaced during the late 18th and early 19th century by the progressive passive (the form is being built as given above). The grammaticality of the progressive passive, called by some the "imperfect passive," was controversial among grammarians in the 19th century, but is accepted without question today. It has been suggested that the passive progressive appeared just to the east of Bristol and was popularized by the Romantic poets.

== See also ==
- E-Prime, a restricted form of English in which the writer or speaker avoids every form of the verb "to be"
- Ergative verb
- Existential clause
- List of common English usage misconceptions
- Mediopassive voice
- Mistakes were made
- Passive voice
- Reflexive verb
