= Anticausative verb =

Concept in linguistics

An anticausative verb (abbreviated antic) is an intransitive verb that shows an event affecting its subject, while giving no semantic or syntactic indication of the cause of the event. The single argument of the anticausative verb (its subject) is a patient, that is, what undergoes an action. One can assume that there is a cause or an agent of causation, but the syntactic structure of the anticausative makes it unnatural or impossible to refer to it directly. Examples of anticausative verbs are break, sink, move, etc.

Anticausative verbs are a subset of unaccusative verbs. Although the terms are generally synonymous, some unaccusative verbs are more obviously anticausative, while others (fall, die, etc.) are not; it depends on whether causation is defined as having to do with an animate volitional agent (does "falling" mean "being accelerated down by gravity" or "being dropped/pushed down by someone"? Is "old age" a causation agent for "dying"?).

A distinction must be made between anticausative and autocausative verbs. A verb is anticausative if the agent is unspecified but assumed to be external (or even if its existence is denied), and it is autocausative if the agent is the same as the patient. Many Indo-European languages lack separate morphological markings for these two classes, and the correct class needs to be derived from context:

(Lithuanian)

- Anticausative: Vežimėlis atsirišo nuo krūmo. 'The cart got untied from the bush.'
- Autocausative: Arklys atsirišo nuo krūmo. 'The horse got [itself] untied from the bush.'

(Russian)

- Anticausative: Чашка упала со стола и разбилась. Čaška upala so stola i razbilasʹ. 'The cup fell from the table and crashed (itself).'
- Autocausative: Водитель разбился на горной дороге. Voditelʹ razbilsja na gornoj doroge. 'The driver crashed (himself) on a mountain road.'

== Examples ==
=== English ===
In English, many anticausatives are of the class of "alternating ambitransitive verbs", where the alternation between transitive and intransitive forms produces a change of the position of the patient role (the transitive form has a patientive direct object, and this becomes the patientive subject in the intransitive). This phenomenon is called causative alternation. For example:

- He broke the window. → The window broke.
- Some pirates sank the ship. → The ship sank.

Passive voice is not an anticausative construction. In passive voice, the agent of causation is demoted from its position as a core argument (the subject), but it can optionally be re-introduced using an adjunct (in English, commonly, a by-phrase). In the examples above, The window was broken, The ship was sunk would clearly indicate causation, though without making it explicit.

=== Romance languages ===
In the Romance languages, many anticausative verbs are formed through a pseudo-reflexive construction, using a clitic pronoun (which is identical to the non-emphatic reflexive pronoun) applied on a transitive verb. For example (in Spanish, using the clitic se):

- El vidrio se quebró. 'The glass shattered.' (Infinitive: quebrar + se)
- Se está hundiendo el barco. or El barco se está hundiendo. or El barco está hundiéndose. 'The boat is sinking.' (Verbal periphrasis or compound verb: estar hundiendo + se in different positions, from the Infinitive: hundirse)

Another example in French:

- Les poissons se pêchaient et se vendaient. 'Fish were being fished and sold.'

=== Slavic languages ===
In the Slavic languages, the use is essentially the same as in the Romance languages. For example (in Serbo-Croatian, using se):

- Staklo se razbilo. 'The glass shattered.'

In East Slavic languages (such as Russian), the pronoun se becomes postfix sja (or sʹ after a vowel in Russian).

- Стекло разбилось. Steklo razbilosʹ. 'The glass shattered.'
- Речка разливается. Rečka razlivaetsja. 'The river is flooding.'

The suffix -sja has a large number of uses and does not necessarily denote anticausativity (or even intransitivity). However, in most cases it denotes either passive voice or one of the subclasses of reflexivity (anticausativity, reciprocity, etc.)

There is a class of verbs (deponent verbs, отложительные глаголы otložitelʹnyje glagoly which only exist in this reflexive form (the suffix -sja can't be removed). These are commonly anticausative or autocausative, and commonly refer to emotions, behavior, or factors outside one's control.

- Иван надеется поступить в университет. Ivan nadeetsja postupitʹ v universitet. 'Ivan hopes to be admitted to the university.'
- Остановка автобуса оказалась рядом с нашей гостиницей. Ostanovka avtobusa okazalasʹ rjadom s našej gostinicej. 'The bus stop turned out to be near to our hotel.'

In addition, a verb may be put into an unaccusative/anticausative form by forming an impersonal sentence, with the verb typically either in its past tense neuter form, or in its present tense third person form:

- Штирлица тянуло на родину. Štirlica tjanulo na rodinu. 'Stirlitz felt himself being drawn to the motherland.' Literally, '[It] was dragging Stirlitz to the motherland.'
- Из окна дуло. Iz okna dulo. 'There was a draft from the window.' Literally, 'From the window [it] was blowing.' Note that the verb has neither agent nor patient, and therefore has valency zero: it is in the impersonal passive voice.

Here as well there is a class of "impersonal verbs", which only exist in this impersonal form:

- Ивана тошнит. Ivana tošnit. 'Ivan is feeling nauseous.' Literally, '[It] is making Ivan nauseous.' The verb тошнить tošnitʹ has no standard personal form. Instead of *Эта рыба меня тошнит *Eta ryba menja tošnit, to say 'This fish is making me nauseous', one must say От этой рыбы меня тошнит Ot etoj ryby menja tošnit 'Because of this fish, [it] is making me nauseous', where 'it' is not 'fish' but something that remains unspecified. (The personal form has, however, entered Russian vernacular, in the meaning 'to irritate, to pester'.)
- Мне везёт в картах. Mne vezjót v kartax. 'I am lucky at cards.' Literally, '[It] transports [things] for me at cards.'

=== Arabic ===
In the Arabic language, the form VII has the anticausative meaning. For example, يَنْقَلِبُ yanqalibu means 'he himself changes' (the cause of his change is not known).

=== Urdu ===
Urdu uses a large number of antiaccusative verbs.

- کھانا پک رہا ہے khānā pak rahā he 'The food is cooking.'
- پانی ابل رہا ہے pānī ubal rahā he 'The water is boiling.'

=== Ainu ===
In Ainu, there are two types of affixes that corresponding to the meaning of "by one's self", si- and yay-. The former is sometimes analyzed as anticausative and the latter is reflexive.

∅=si-pusu
3SG/3PL.SUBJ=ANTIC-set.afloat
He spontaneously floated to the surface.

∅=yay-pusu
3SG/3PL.SUBJ=REFL-set.afloat
He (swam and) floated to the surface by himself.

=== Japanese ===
In Standard Japanese, productive morphology highly favors transitivization, in the sense that it has productive causativization, but no anticausativization. In the Hokkaido dialects and Northern Tōhoku dialect, however, the anticausative morpheme -(r)asar- is employed with some verbs, such as maku 'to roll', tsumu 'to load', and okuru 'to send' as a means of producing an intransitive verb from a transitive verb.

botan=ga os-asat-ta
button=NOM press-ANTIC-PST
‘The button got pressed.’

kōtei=ni maru=ga kak-asat-teiru
schoolyard=LOC circle=NOM draw-ANTIC-STAT
‘A circle is drawn in the schoolyard.’

=== Bardi ===
Bardi is an Australian Aboriginal language in the Nyulnyulan family which uses the root -jiidi- 'go' to denote anticausatives as part of complex predicate constructions. For example, whereas one might causatively 'close' a door with the following construction:

- boonda - ma - (y ERG closes x ABS)

a door might 'close' with the following construction

- boonda - jiidi - (x ABS closes)

In the underived construction, the light verb -ma- 'put' is used with a coverb (or preverb) boonda 'close'. In the anticausative construction, the light verb reduces the valency of the predicate and the item which is closed becomes the subject. This is a regular alternation among complex predicates.

=== Turkish ===
When an anticausative verb is used, the thing that is acted upon is placed as if it is the subject. Turkish converts the verb to an anticausative most commonly by the suffixes -l and -n.

- Kapıyı açtı. 'He/she/it opened the door.' (The word door (kapı) takes the accusative suffix here.
- Kapı açıldı. 'The door opened.' (Kapı lost its case suffix and is treated as a subject)

== See also ==
- Grammatical voice
- Mediopassive voice
- Unaccusative verb
