= Transitivity (grammar) =

Property regarding whether a lexical item denotes a transitive object

Transitivity is a linguistics property that relates to whether a verb, participle, or gerund denotes a transitive object. It is closely related to valency, which considers other arguments in addition to transitive objects.

English grammar makes a binary distinction between intransitive verbs (e.g., arrive, belong, or die, which do not denote a transitive object) and transitive verbs (e.g., announce, bring, or complete, which must denote a transitive object). Many languages, including English, have ditransitive verbs that denote two objects, and some verbs may be ambitransitive in a manner that is either transitive (e.g., "I read the book" or "We won the game") or intransitive (e.g., "I read until bedtime" or "We won") depending on the given context.

== History ==
The notion of transitivity, as well as other notions that today are the basics of linguistics, was first introduced by the Stoics and the Peripatetic school, but they probably referred to the whole sentence containing transitive or intransitive verbs, not just to the verb. The discovery of the Stoics was later used and developed by the philologists of the Alexandrian school and later grammarians.

== Formal analysis ==
Many languages, such as Hungarian, mark transitivity through morphology; transitive verbs and intransitive verbs behave in distinctive ways. In languages with polypersonal agreement, an intransitive verb will agree with its subject only, while a transitive verb will agree with both subject and direct object.

In other languages the distinction is based on syntax. It is possible to identify an transitive verb in English, for example, by attempting to supply it with an appropriate direct object:

- She changed her clothing — transitive verb
- His changed attitude — transitive participle
- The wind began changing directions — transitive gerund

By contrast, an intransitive verb coupled with a direct object will result in an ungrammatical utterance:

- *What did you arrive?
- *I belong the team.

Conversely (at least in a traditional analysis), using a transitive verb in English without a direct object will result in an incomplete sentence:

  - I announced.
  - You brought.
- Did she complete the task? *Yes, she completed.

English is unusually lax by comparison with other Indo-European languages in its rules on transitivity; what may appear to be a transitive verb can be used as an intransitive verb, and vice versa. Eat and read and many other verbs can be used either transitively or intransitively. Often there is a semantic difference between the intransitive and transitive forms of a verb: the water is boiling versus I boiled the water; the grapes grew versus I grew the grapes. In these examples of ergativity, the role of the subject differs between the intransitive and transitive usages.

Even though an intransitive verb may not take a direct object, it often may take an appropriate indirect object:

- I laughed at him.

Intransitive verbs can also take cognate objects, where the object is considered integral to the action, for example She slept a troubled sleep.

=== Languages that express transitivity through morphology ===
The following languages, grouped by language family (either established or hypothetical), are given as examples where transitivity is expressed morphologically:

In the Sino-Tibetan language family:

- Lhasa Tibetan

In the Uralo-Altaic hypothetical language family:

- Mordvinic languages
- The three Ugric languages
- Northern Samoyedic languages
- Turkic languages
- Mongolic languages
- Korean
- Japanese

In the Indo-Aryan branch of the Indo-European language familyː

- Hindi-Urdu (Hindustani)
- Punjabi
- Gujarati

In the Paleosiberian hypothetical language family:

- Languages of both branches of the Eskimo–Aleut family; examples from the Eskimo branch are Sireniki and Kalaallisut
- Chukotko-Kamchatkan languages
- Yukaghir
- The Ket language has a very sophisticated verbal inclination system, referring to the object in many ways (see also polypersonal agreement).

All varieties of Melanesian Pidgin use -im or -em as a transitivity marker:

- Tok Pisin, for example, has laik meaning 'want', while laikim means 'like (him/her/it)'
- Bislama
- Solomon Islands Pidgin
- Torres Strait Creole

All Salishan languages.

== Form–function mappings ==
Formal transitivity is associated with a variety of semantic functions across languages. In a crosslinguistic analysis, Hopper and Thompson (1980) have proposed decomposing the notion of transitivity into ten formal and semantic features (some binary, some scalar); the features they propose are summarized in the following table:

| | High | Low |
|---|---|---|
| A. Participants | 2 or more participants, A and O | 1 participant |
| B. Kinesis | action | non-action |
| C. Aspect | telic | atelic |
| D. Punctuality | punctual | non-punctual |
| E. Volitionality | volitional | non-volitional |
| F. Affirmation | affirmative | negative |
| G. Mode | realis | irrealis |
| H. Agency | A high in potency | A low in potency |
| I. Affectedness of O | O totally affected | O not affected |
| J. Individuation of O | O highly individuated | O non-individuated |

Næss (2007) has argued at length for the following two points:

1. Though formally a broad category of phenomena, transitivity boils down to a way to maximally distinguish the two participants involved (pp. 22–25);
2. Major participants are describable in terms of the semantic features [±Volitional] [±Instigating] [±Affected] which makes them distinctive from each other. Different combinations of these binary values will yield different types of participants (pg. 89), which are then compatible or incompatible with different verbs. Individual languages may, of course, make more fine-grained distinctions (chapter 5).

Types of participants discussed include:

- Volitional Undergoers (some Experiencer, Recipients, Beneficiaries): [+Vol], [-Inst], [+Aff]

ex. me in Spanish Me gusta. ['I like it.']

- Force: [-Vol], [+Inst], [-Aff]

ex. the tornado in The tornado broke my windows.

- Instrument: [-Vol], [+Inst], [+Aff]

ex. the hammer in The hammer broke the cup.

== See also ==
- Differential object marking
- Ergative–absolutive language
- Impersonal verb
- Unaccusative verb
