= Ambitransitive verb =

Verb that is both transitive and intransitive

An ambitransitive verb is a verb that is both intransitive and transitive. This verb may or may not require a direct object. English has many ambitransitive verbs. Examples include read, break, and understand (e.g., "I read the book", saying what was read, or just "I read all afternoon").

Ambitransitive verbs are common in some languages, and much less so in other languages, where valency tends to be fixed, and there are explicit valency-changing operations (such as passive voice, antipassive voice, applicatives, causatives, etc.).

== Agentive and patientive ==
Generally speaking, there are two types of ambitransitive verbs, distinguished by the alignment of the semantic roles of their arguments with their syntactic roles.

=== Agentive ===
Agentive (S = A) ambitransitives are those where the single argument of the intransitive (S) is agentive (Note: Mithun, Marianne. (2000). "Valency-changing derivation in Central Alaskan Yup'ik". In Dixon & Aikhenvald (2000) pp. 84–114.) and it corresponds to the agent (A) of the transitive. In Mary (S) is knitting, and Mary (A) is knitting a scarf (O), the person doing the knitting in both sentences is Mary. (Note: Dixon, R.M.W. (2000). "A Typology of Causatives: Form, Syntax, and Meaning". In Dixon & Aikhenvald (2000) pp. 30–83) Likely candidates for this type of ambitransitives include those where an action can be described in general terms or with respect to a specific patient. English examples include eat, follow, help, knit, read, try, watch, win, know, and many others. These transitive versions have been called unergative verbs, but this term is not fully accepted since it is used for many other senses.

=== Patientive ===
Patientive (S = O) ambitransitives are those where the single argument of the intransitive (S) corresponds to the object (O) of the transitive. For example, in the sentence John (S) tripped and John (A) tripped Mary (O), John is doing the falling in the first sentence. Likely candidates for this type of ambitransitive are verbs that affect an agent spontaneously, or those that can be engineered by an agent. English has bend, break, burn, burst, change, cool, enter, extend, fall, frighten, grow, hurry, melt, move, open, spill, stretch, trip, turn, twist, and many other verbs. Such verbs are also called labile verbs (or "ergative verbs").

Confusingly, verbs of this type have also been called unaccusative verbs, middle voice, anticausative verbs in the literature, but these terms usually have other meanings in the literature. In a useful discussion of the terminology, Dixon flat out rejects the use of the word ergative to describe such verbs, which was originated by Halliday's 1967 paper and propagated by Lyons' 1968 textbook, because the "ergativity" is contained entirely in the lexical unit and has no influence on a language's overall morphological or syntactic ergativity.

For some of these verbs, native speakers' intuition tells us these words are primarily transitive and secondarily intransitive (such as smash or extend). For other words, the opposite is true (trip, explode, melt, dissolve, walk, march). This latter group can be said to undergo change into a causative verb.

== Pseudo-reflexivity ==
Alternating ambitransitives are not uncommon in English. In the Romance languages, such verbs are rarely found, since the same semantic concept is covered by pseudo-reflexive verbs. These verbs behave like ambitransitives, but the intransitive form requires a clitic pronoun that usually serves also for reflexive constructions. See for example, in Spanish (which uses the pronoun se in the third person):

- La ventana se rompió. "The window broke."
- Este barco se está hundiendo. "This boat is sinking."
- Se derritió todo el helado. "All of the ice cream melted."

In the example, the verbs romper, hundir and derretir are all transitive; they become intransitive by using the pseudo-reflexive clitic, and the direct object becomes the intransitive subject.

Ambiguity may arise between these and true reflexive forms, especially when the intransitive subject is animate (and therefore a possible agent). Me estoy hundiendo usually means "I'm sinking" (patientive first person), but it could also mean "I'm sinking myself", "I'm getting myself sunk" (agentive).

== See also ==
- Diathesis alternation
- Labile verb
- Valency (linguistics)
- Transitivity (grammar)
