= Ergative =

The term ergative is used in grammar in three different meanings:

- Ergative case, the grammatical case of the subject of a transitive verb in an ergative-absolutive language
- Ergative–absolutive language, a language in which the subject of an intransitive verb behaves like the object of a transitive verb
- Ergative verb, a verb whose subject when intransitive corresponds to its direct object when transitive
