= Resultative =

Linguistic concept marking change of state

In linguistics, a resultative (abbreviated res) is a form that expresses that something or someone has undergone a change in state as the result of the completion of an event. Resultatives appear as predicates of sentences, and are generally composed of a verb (denoting the event), a post-verbal noun phrase (denoting the entity that has undergone a change) and a so-called resultative phrase (denoting the state achieved as the result of the action named by the verb) which may be represented by an adjective, a prepositional phrase, or a particle, among others. For example, in the English sentence The man wiped the table clean, the adjective clean denotes the state achieved by the table as a result of the event described as the man wiped.

== Resultative constructions ==
Resultative constructions are set syntactic patterns used to express resultativeness. Within these structures, the object NP is viewed as having undergone some change of state, and the change is viewed as a result achieved through the action expressed by the combination of the verb and the result phrase. The word order of the elements is said to be constant and crucial in conveying the resultative meaning; under this analysis, the output in its entirety is regarded as having a more complex meaning than the sum of its components' individual meanings. This constructional approach has been proposed in order to account for the semantic differences between standalone verbs that have no intrinsic resultative meaning and their resultative counterparts (e.g. hammer versus hammer... flat).

=== Systems of differentiation ===
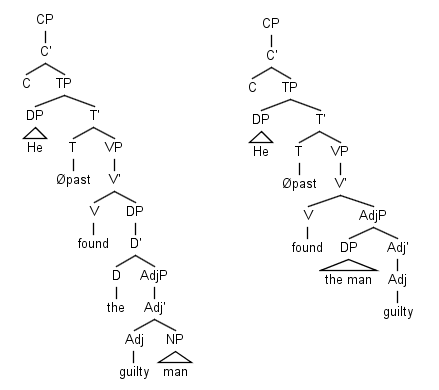
Syntactic trees showing the difference in structure between non-resultative and resultative phrases.

Resultative constructions can be described in the framework of a sign-oriented approach: morphological signals and word order signals (based on the ordering of lexical items) interact in order to create meaning. This interaction generates a system of oppositions based on two types of differentiation: differentiation of the referent from other referents in the lexicon and differentiation of the referent from itself.

Differentiation from Other	Differentiation from Self
He painted the red barn.	He painted the barn red.
She wore her long hair.	She wore her hair long.
He found the guilty man.	He found the man guilty.
He made the sacred porridge.	He made the porridge sacred.

=== Classes of resultative constructions ===
Semantically, resultative constructions can be part of one of four major classes, defined by two attributes: causative vs. non-causative, and property vs. path. (See table below.) These classes are distinguished by the relation between the noun phrase undergoing the change expressed by the resultative (referred to as the host) and the resultative construction itself.

In causative resultatives, the host is the direct object of the resultative construction; the subject causes the host to undergo a change. In noncausative resultatives, the host is the subject of the resultative construction; the sentence states a change of state or position.

In property resultatives, the host comes to have the property expressed by the resultative construction. In path resultatives, the resultative construction describes a path that is traversed by the host.

	Causative	Noncausative
Property	The gardener watered the tulips flat	The lake froze solid
Path	Bill rolled the ball down the hill	The ball rolled down the hill

== Traditional view ==
Defining the role and category of resultatives has inspired numerous approaches from linguists. Traditionally, certain tenses and aspects have been attributed to resultatives. Namely, the present perfect aspect is pointed to in explaining resultative constructions like I have written them a letter. There is a stress on the sense of completeness inherent in resultatives: A: Have you cleaned the windows? B: No, I haven't finished them yet. B: Yes, but I haven't finished them yet

In this example, answering negatively entails that either some or none of the windows have been cleaned, but you cannot answer positively unless the entire task is completed. The task does not require successful completion as found in the example He has not passed his exam.

It has been demonstrated, however, that resultatives exist independently of the perfect in sentences like I turned this offer down, creating the need to reexamine the role of resultatives. To address this, it has been claimed that the resultative expresses both a state and the preceding action it has resulted from. This emphasizes that the resultative describes how a state was acted upon. Therefore, it must use the passive form. However, this analysis does not account for phrases such as I turned this offer down, which use the active rather than the passive voice.

== Sign-oriented analysis ==
Sign-oriented analyses present an aspectual contrast, in which the approach is based on the boundaries of predication within a time-field. An action is perceived as a whole within a predication or it could be perceived as the predication within the boundaries. A markedness relationship is one between the perfective and imperfective. This analysis argues against the view that the resultative meaning is identical to the perfect. Below are sentences where the verbs in the perfect do not have the ‘element of result’ in their meaning:

I’ve seen it before. It’s only been three or four times that we’ve come face to face.

In the sentences above ‘the element of result’ does not seem apparent. It is argued that the concrete result and the result phase should be distinguished from each other.

=== The Guillaumean approach ===
This aspectual approach shows the relation between an action and its result. The Guillaumean approach posits that the English verb has two moments, one where any duration, any developments, or any actualizations take place within the event's duration.

The Guillaumean Chart of notational chronology
before	after
cause	effect
condition	consequence
operation	result

=== The resultative as a feature of English ===
Yet another approach to resultativeness views it as “a fundamental semantic distinctive feature which cuts across almost all traditional categories: verb, noun, adjective, infinitive, gerund, participle, particle, auxiliary”. It is claimed that the resultative should be a distinctive feature in language instead of being a subcategory within the verbal aspect realm.

== As a system of oppositions ==
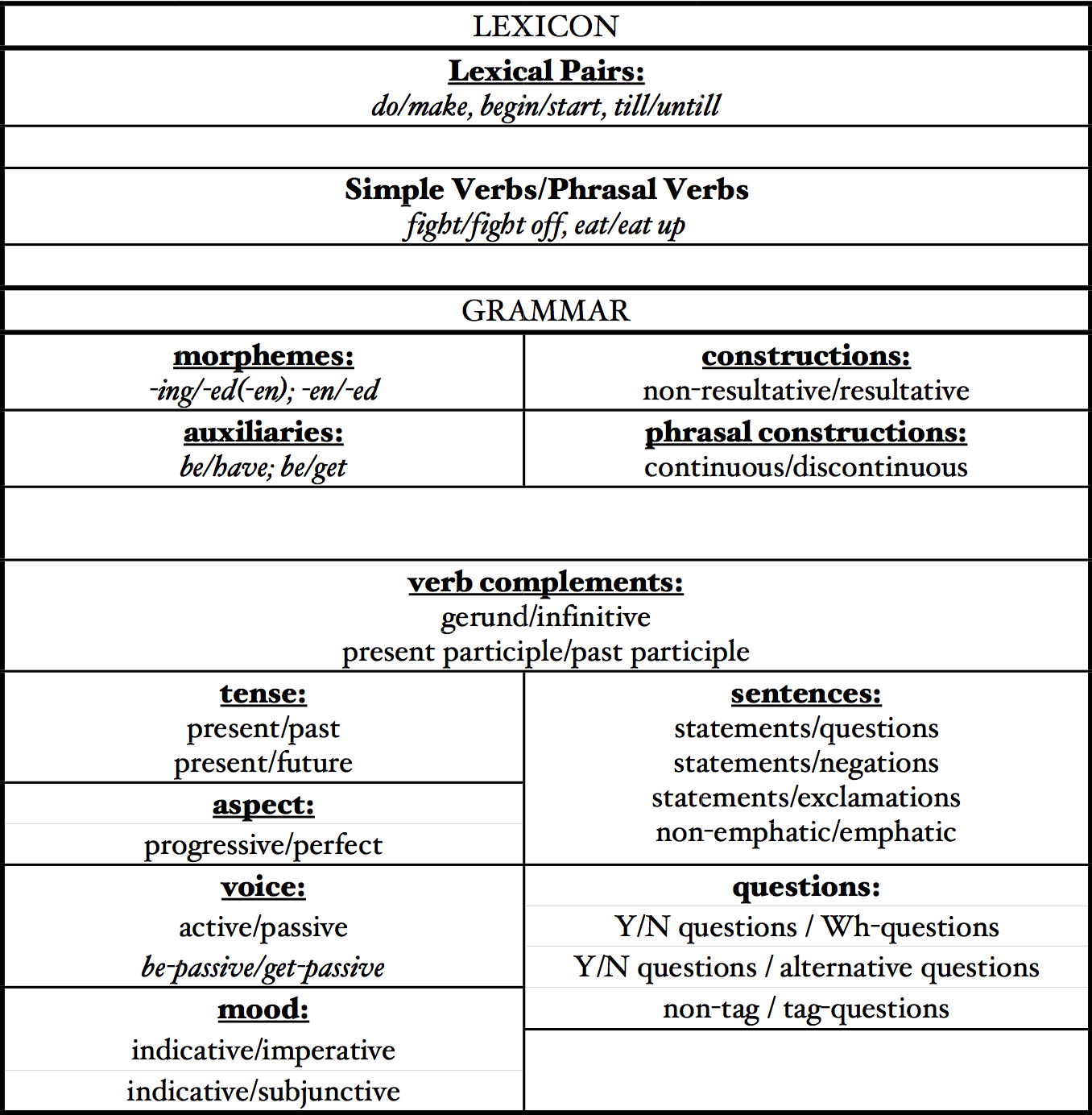
Result-based oppositions in the lexicon

This approach suggests the idea of viewing resultativeness as a system of oppositions. It hypothesizes that the resultative is not restricted to a tense or an aspect form. It suggests that the resultativeness is expressed by oppositions of marked/unmarked forms throughout all language levels and subsystems. Markedness is a system that contrasts two language forms as distinguished based on simplicity and frequency of usage.(For example, irregular verbs will be marked, whereas regular verbs will be unmarked)

These subsystems includes: morpheme, auxiliaries, lexical pairs, compounds, verb complements, tense aspect and voice forms, syntactic patters, types of sentences, word order, stress, and intonation.

Gorlach, in her book, proposes that resultativeness happens depending whether the subsystem is marked or not. For example, in the sentence "I am wiping the table" the affix -ing is marked and expresses neutral state instead of resultative state. -ed, on the other hand, is unmarked form of affix, thus making the following sentence express resultativeness: "I wiped the table".

Extended list of marked/unmarked form of all language subsystems can be found in the table.

== Distribution ==
A resultative is either an adjectival phrase indicating the state of a noun resulting from the completion of the event denoted by the verb, or a verbal construction denoting the result state of an event. This verbal construction type of resultative is usually considered part of the field of aspect.

=== Adjectival resultatives ===
This type of resultative is a phrase that indicates the state of a noun resulting from the completion of the verb. In the English examples below, the affected noun is shown in bold and the resulting predicate is in italics:

- John licked **his plate** clean.
- Mary painted **the fence** blue.
- The cold weather froze **the lake** solid.

Subjects of passive and unaccusative verbs may participate in resultative constructions:

- Passive: **The well** was drained dry.
- Unaccusative: **The door** swung open.

Subjects of unergative verbs may also participate in resultative constructions, but a "dummy object", that is, an otherwise absent reflexive pronoun must be inserted:

- **Gordon** laughed **himself** helpless.
- **The girl** screamed **herself** hoarse.

Resultatives are distinct from depictive constructions, though often both a resultative and a depictive reading is possible from the same sentence. For example, in "John fried the fish dry", a resultative reading suggests that as a result of John's frying, the fish became dry. On the other hand, also possible is a depictive reading in which John is already dry, and that is the state in which he is frying the fish (because e.g. he had been back from the beach for long enough to be dry). Both depictives and resultatives are important in the understanding of small clauses because their exact properties seem to vary considerably from language to language.

==== Resultatives in German ====
In German, some verbs can occur in adjectival resultative sentences while others cannot. In the example below, an argument can be made that the noun phrase after the verb can be interpreted as a verb argument.

Der Schmied hämmert das Metall flach.
'The smith hammers the metal flat.'

=== Verbal resultatives ===
This sort of resultative is a grammatical aspect construction that indicates the result state of the event denoted by the verb. English does not have a productive resultative construction. It is widely accepted that the be-perfects of various European languages (e.g. French, Italian, German, and Dutch) began as resultative constructions.

==== Resultatives in Mandarin ====
Mandarin places the resultative within a verb aspect construction.

张三 擦干净了 桌子。
Zhāngsān cā-gānjìng-le zhuōzi.
Zhangsan wipe-clean-PFV table
'Zhangsan wiped the table clean.'

In this example, the resultative gānjìng is situated within the verb aspect construction. The verb cā- takes the theta roles of agent and experiencer. Resultative phrases may also take multiple theta-roles. The linguist Fengqi Li calls these “composite roles”.

斧子 砍钝了。
Fǔzi kǎn-dùn-le
Axe cut-dull-PFV
'The axe became dull because of overuse.'

Here, the theta-roles are agent, experiencer and instrument. The experiencer and instrument are both the ax, but they take composite roles. The verb cut is transitive and therefore requires a direct object. The composite role allows the knife to undergo its own action.

==== Resultatives in Japanese ====
The resultative construction in English might be represented as SVO AP.

a. John shot Mary dead.
b. John painted the wall blue.

The Japanese translation of the sentences a. and b. in the above table would have two distinct constructions. The first construction has a complex verb strategy, where V_{2} is the causative change of state verb, or result state corresponding to the AP in English construction. V_{1} is a verb of simple activity, which corresponds to V in the English construction.

ジョンが メアリーを 撃ち殺した。
Jon-ga Mearī-o uchi-koroshi-ta.
John-NOM Mary-ACC shoot-kill-PAST
'John shot Mary dead.'
