= Diathesis alternation =

Concept in linguistics

In linguistics, diathesis alternation or verb alternation occurs when the same verb can be used in different subcategorization frames or with different valency, as in Fred ate the pizza (where ate is transitive, with object the pizza) vs. Fred ate (where ate is intransitive, with no object). The two usages usually have a slight difference in meaning. Using a single verb, one can also change the position of a phrase’s arguments which may or may not change the sentence’s meaning as well.

It is a hard problem for theoretical linguistics how to encode constraints on the diathesis alternation of a specific verb to a lexicon. It is also claimed that the manner in which verbs undergo diathesis alternation can be used to identify the semantic class they belong to e.g. in a machine learning task.

== Examples ==
- Fred ate the pizza vs. Fred ate
- Mary broke the window vs. The window broke
- Mary presented the flowers to John vs. Mary presented John with the flowers

== See also ==
- Active-stative alignment
- Ambitransitive verb
- Voice (grammar)
- Dative shift
- Causative alternation
- Valency (linguistics)
