= Autocausative verb =

Type of reflexive verb

Autocausative refers to a type of reflexive that denotes "in an overwhelming majority of cases, change of location or motion which the (human) referent causes by his own activity." In this kind of event, "the mind or will of an animate entity initiates some movement of their own body [...] or a part thereof." The (usually animated) "referent represented by the subject combines the activity of actor and undergoes a change of state like a patient/subject." Some Spanish examples include "verbs of displacement," such as mudarse 'to move (in the sense of changing domicile)', moverse 'to displace', and desplazarse 'to displace', and "internal bodily motion," such as agitarse 'to shake', removerse 'to fidget', revolverse 'toss and turn'.
