= Unaccusative verb =

Concept in linguistics

In linguistics, an unaccusative verb is an intransitive verb that takes a subject argument which is not a semantic agent, and does not actively initiate, or take responsibility for, the action expressed by the verb. Such subject is semantically similar to the direct object of a transitive verb or the subject when in the passive voice.

Examples in English are "the tree fell"; "the window broke". In those sentences, the action (falling, breaking) can be considered as something that happened to the subject, rather than being initiated by it. Semantically, the word "tree" in the sentence "the tree fell" plays a similar role to that in a transitive sentence, such as "they cut down the tree", or its passive transformation "the tree was cut down". Unaccusative verbs thus contrast with unergative verbs, such as run or resign, which describe actions voluntarily initiated by the subject. They are called unaccusative because although the subject has the semantic role of a patient, it is not assigned accusative case.

In nominative–accusative languages, the accusative case, which marks the direct object of transitive verbs, usually represents the non-volitional argument (often the patient). However, for unaccusative verbs, although the subject is non-volitional, it is not marked by the accusative. As Perlmutter points out, the same verb such as "slide" can be either unaccusative or unergative, depending on whether the action was involuntary or voluntary. The term "unaccusative verb" was first used in a 1978 paper by David M. Perlmutter of the University of California, San Diego. Perlmutter credited the linguist Geoffrey K. Pullum with inventing the terms "unaccusative" and "unergative".

== History of the concept ==
=== Perlmutter's unaccusative hypothesis (1978) ===
The derivation of the core properties of unaccusative constructions from a set of principles has been one of the topmost issues of the agenda of modern syntax since the seminal work by Perlmutter 1978 (cf. Burzio 1986 and Hale-Keyser 2003 for landmark proposals). Perlmutter introduced the "Unaccusative Hypothesis" in 1978 explaining that intransitive verbs are not homogeneous, but are either unaccusative verbs or unergative verbs. The Unaccusative Hypothesis was later integrated into the Government and Binding Theory by Burzio (1986). The Unaccusative Hypothesis (UH) argues that the Object of the sentence becomes the Subject in the derivation, meanwhile unergatives start as subjects. More specifically, the first approach introduced by the Unaccusative Hypothesis arrived at an important consequence constituting an analogy between English passive voice constructions and unaccusative constructions whereas in the second approach a more radical theory was proposed based on the analysis of expletive there stemming from the sentences with the copula suggested in Moro 1997.

==== Acquisition of unaccusatives ====
While L2 learners have difficulties with the distinction between unaccusative and unergative verbs, children when learning their first language do not encounter those same difficulties. Studies have shown that children as young as 2 years old can distinguish between unaccusative and unergative verbs. Tests have been done on 2 year olds in Hebrew and Portuguese (Friedmann 2007), on 4 & 5 year olds in German and Dutch (van Hout, 1996; Randall, van Hout, Baayen & Weissenborn, 2004), 2 & 3 year olds in Italian and French (Lorusso, Caprin, and Guasti 2004, Snyder et al., 1995), and 3 - 6 year olds in Russian (using Genitive-of-Negation tests) (Babyonyshev et al. 2001). These studies all concluded that children from a young age are able to differentiate between unaccusatives, unergatives, and transitives.

==== Split Intransitivity ====
Further linguistic studies have shown that intransitive verbs will identify as either unergative or unaccusative, determined by the language. A recent study proposed by James Baker in 2019 suggests that intransitive verbs not only identify as either unaccusative or unergative, but with multiple different classes. According to Baker, the Split Intransitivity analysis has various advantages over the traditional approach in terms of argument structure. The original traditional hypothesis proposed by Levin & Rappaport-Hovav in 1995 mentions linking rules referring to either an external or internal argument. In Split Intransitivity, Baker introduces additional components to the processing of unaccusative verbs he calls Initiation, State, and Change.

=== Oshita's unaccusative trap hypothesis (1997, 2001) ===
The Unaccusative Trap Hypothesis, developed by Oshita in 1997 and 2001, proposes to bring several unaccusative-related phenomena cross-linguistically and to address L2 acquisition on unaccusative verbs. According to Oshita, L2 learners undergo a 3-step process before they have the knowledge to distinguish between unaccusative and unergative verbs. In the Unaccusative Trap Hypothesis, at the first stage, unaccusatives are acquired as unergatives in L2 learners. In the second stage, L2 learners realize and become awakened to the natural linking rules proposed by Levin and Rappaport Havov in 1995. Even in this second stage, there is a stage of syntactic confusion with derivations into the sentence structure. Since Unaccusatives have different syntactic rules for their target languages, the non-target interlanguage phenomena for Japanese or other languages, for example, will be different than those observed in English. Oshita mentions that L2 learners must unlearn non-target syntactic operations and reach the third stage. By this stage, they are out of confusion and can understand unaccusative constructions natively. This study, discussed by Junhua Mo in 2020, analyzed the Unaccusative Trap Hypothesis with L2 English learners and calls for further study. The linking rules associated proposed by Levin and Rappaport Hovav were only effective for L1 acquisition of English, not applicable to L2 acquisition.

=== Neural correlates of unaccusative Verbs ===
According to linguistic theory, unaccusative verbs have sentences that undergo lexical and syntactic operations that do not occur with unergative and transitives. A recent study in 2010 by Friedmann, Shetreet, and Hadar explains and supports this linguistic theory by showing that there are two separate activation locations from unaccusative and unergative verbs in the brain. This study focused on neural correlations of linguistic distinction between Unaccusatives and Unergatives. This study was taken from participants who were tested in their native language, Hebrew. The differences between Unaccusative and Unergative (and transitive) verbs arose from differences in syntactic and lexical derivations.

== Structure ==
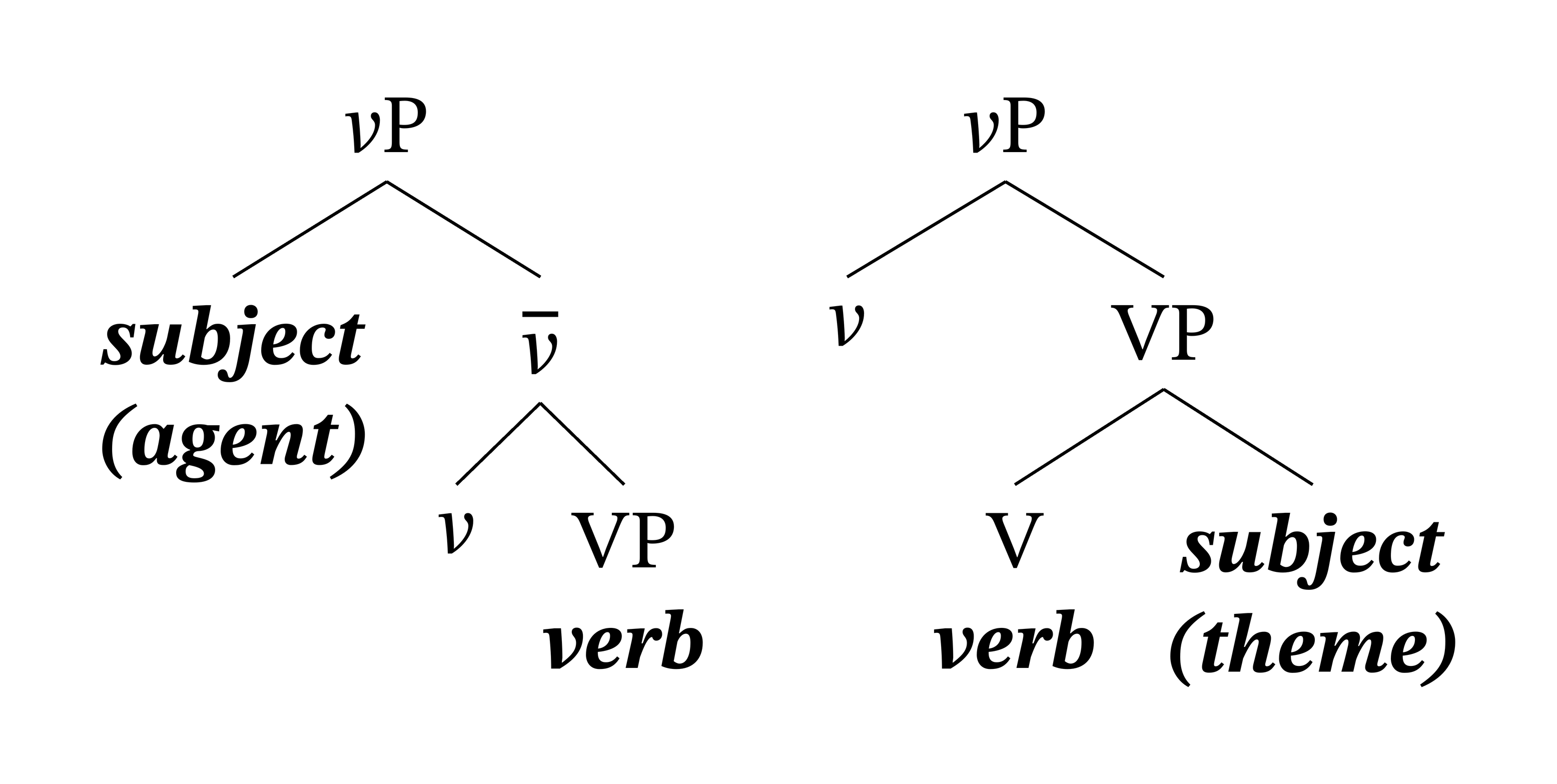
Unergative (left) and unaccusative (right) verb structures

Unaccusative and unergative verbs, while syntactically different, are communicated the same on the surface. They both include a noun phrase (NP) followed by a verb phrase (VP) when produced. In generative grammar, an unaccusative verb is analysed as having an underlying VP shell in which the NP is selected by the bottom-most VP and later moved. For an unergative verb, on the other hand, the NP is selected by the topmost VP in a VP shell, and therefore is not required to move to create a surface level order of the noun being followed by the verb. The image to the right demonstrates how the noun in an unaccusative is the direct object of the sentence, as it is selected by the VP as a complement, whereas the noun in an unergative is the subject of the sentence.

== Auxiliary selection as a test for unaccusativity ==
The unaccusative/unergative split in intransitive verbs can be characterized semantically. Unaccusative verbs tend to express a telic and dynamic change of state or location, while unergative verbs tend to express an agentive activity (not involving directed movement). While these properties define the "core" classes of unaccusatives and unergatives, there are intermediate classes of verbs whose status is less clear (for example, verbs of existence, appearance, or continuation, verbs denoting uncontrolled processes, or motion verbs).

A number of syntactic criteria for unaccusativity have also been identified. The most well-known test is auxiliary selection in languages that use two different temporal auxiliaries (have and be) for analytic past/perfect verb forms (e.g. German, Dutch, French, Italian; even Early Modern English). In these languages, unaccusative verbs combine with be, while unergative verbs combine with have.

French:
unaccusative: Je suis tombé. lit. "I am fallen." (= "I have fallen.")
unergative: J'ai travaillé. "I have worked."

Italian:
unaccusative: È arrivato. lit. "[He] is arrived." (= "He has arrived.")
unergative: Ha telefonato. "[He] has phoned."

From one language to another, however, synonymous verbs do not always select the same auxiliary, and even within one language, a single verb may combine with either auxiliary (either depending on the meaning/context, or with no observable semantic motivation, sometimes depending on regional variation of the language). The auxiliary selection criterion therefore also identifies core classes of unaccusative and unergatives (which show the least variation within and across languages) and more peripheral classes (where variation and context effects are observed). There are languages which do not have auxiliary selection, such as Russian, and therefore other tests sometimes have to be used to determine whether a verb is unaccusative or unergative

Other tests that have been studied involve passivization (see Impersonal passive voice), ne/en cliticization in Italian and French, and impersonal, participial, and resultative constructions in a wide range of languages.

For example, in Dutch and Turkish, unergative verbs can be used in impersonal passive constructions, but unaccusative verbs cannot. In the following example from Dutch, the verb is unergative, describing a voluntary action, and can be made passive:

Er wordt hier veel geskied.
"A lot of skiing is done here." (lit. "it is skied much here")

But a sentence with an unaccusative verb, such as "The concert lasted a long time", cannot be made passive.

In Japanese, the grammaticality of sentences that appear to violate syntactic rules may signal the presence of an unaccusative verb. According to transformational models of grammar, such sentences contain a trace located in the direct object position that helps to satisfy the mutual c-command condition between numeral quantifiers and the noun phrases they modify (Tsujimura, 2007).

== Unaccusativity in English ==
=== Tests for English unaccusative verbs ===
Modern English uses only one perfect auxiliary (have), although archaic examples like "He is fallen/come" reflect the use of be with unaccusative verbs in earlier stages of the language. The identification of unaccusative verbs in English is therefore based on other criteria, notably:

- Many unaccusative verbs alternate with a corresponding transitive verb, where the unaccusative subject appears in direct object position.
  The ice melted. ≈ The sun melted the ice.
  The window broke. ≈ The golf ball broke the window.
- Past participles of unaccusative verb can be used as a nominal modifier with active meaning. This is not possible with unergative past participles, as indicated by the asterisk (*).

Past participle test for unaccusative verbs
unaccusative verb	past participle	unergative verb	past participle
The snow melted.	the melted snow	The victim shouted.	*the shouted victim
The guests departed.	the departed guests	The child slept.	*the slept child
The soldier fell.	the fallen soldier	The leader hesitated.	*the hesitated leader

- The subject of an unaccusative verb can be modified by a resultative adjunct. This is a property shared by direct objects and passive subjects, but not shared by the subjects of unergative and transitive verbs.

Resultative adjunct test for unaccusative verbs
resultative adjunct can modify:	unaccusative verb	unergative verb
subject in intransitive verb	The vase broke into pieces.	*John dined full/to death/two pounds heavier.
direct object of transitive verb	John broke the vase into pieces.	(not applicable)
subject of transitive verb	(not applicable)	*John ate the brownies full/to death/two pounds heavier.
subject of passive verb	The vase was broken into pieces.	*The brownies full/to death/two pounds heavier.

While "to die" has been classified as an unaccusative verb, like "to fall" and "to arrive", Dąbrowska (2016) noted that "to die" is an example of Unaccusative Mismatch, because "to die" behaves:

unaccusatively in some tests, e.g. (!)There laughed a girl in the room (unergative) vs. There appeared a lady on the scene (unaccusative) vs. There died a myriad;
yet unergatively in others, e.g. Philip died vs. (!)The soldier died Philip.

=== Types of English unaccusative verbs ===
Perlmutter (1978) gives examples of various types of unaccusative verbs. He emphasises that the following categories are not definitive, and that alternative classifications are possible.

Perlmutter's (1978) classification of English unaccusative verbs
(a)	the verb "be" with adjectives	be heavy, be red, etc.
(b)	verbs whose grammatical subject is semantically a Patient	(i) burn, fall, sink, float, flow, slip, slide, shake, stumble, succumb, boil, dry, sway, wave, lie (involuntary), bend (involuntary)
		(ii) melt, freeze, evaporate, solidify, darken, rot, wither, collapse, break, increase, germinate, die, suffocate, crack, split, disappear, disperse, explode
(c)	predicates of existing and happening	exist, happen, occur, arise, ensue, turn up
(d)	non-voluntary verbs of appearance, sound, smell, etc.	shine, sparkle, clink, snap (involuntary), pop, smell (bad), stink
(e)	aspectual predicates	begin, start, stop, continue, end
(f)	duratives	last, remain, stay, survive

Perlmutter points out that some verbs can be used in either unaccusative or unergative clauses. If the action is deliberate or willed, the clause is unergative:

The figurine stood on this table. – (unaccusative)
The children stood on this table. – (unergative)

== Unaccusativity in Russian ==
Unlike the subtle evidence for unaccusatives in English, Russian provides strong tests to determine unaccusativity. The four tests for unaccusativity in Russian are:

- po-phrases
- na-phrases
- Locative Inversion
- Genitive-of-Negation (GN)

When the subject of an unaccusative verb appears in a po-phrase, the verb will lack subject-verb agreement. This construction would be ungrammatical for unergatives, causing a distinction to be visible between unaccusatives and unergatives.

Я дал мальчикам по яблоку
I gave-MASC.SG boys-DAT (po) apple-DAT
‘I gave the boys an apple each.’

По яблоку упало с каждого дерева
(po) apple-DAT fell-NEUT.SG from each-GEN.SG tree-GEN
‘A (different) apple fell from each tree.’

В каждой квартире смеялось по мальчику.
in each apartment laughed-NEUT.SG-REFL (po) boy-DAT
‘A (different) boy laughed in each apartment.’

Na-phrases affect the interpretation of the internal arguments of the verb. This would be the NP in the direct object position of a transitive verb or the NP in the subject position of an unaccusative verb, once again creating a clear distinction between unaccusatives and unergatives.

Дети купили много книг
children-NOM bought-PL many books-GEN
‘The children bought a lot of books.’

Много травы наросло в парке
much grass-GEN grew-NEUT.SG in park
‘A lot of grass grew in the park.’

*Много детей наиграло в парке
many children-GEN played-NEUT.SG in park
‘Many children played in the park.’

Locative Inversion (Babyonyshev 1996) is a construction that is only possible for the NPs in the position of the subject of unaccusative verbs. These three tests, while they do distinguish unaccusatives from unergatives, are seldom used in everyday speech.

В углу валялась куртка
in corner lay-FEM.SG-REFL jacket-NOM
‘In the corner lay a jacket.’

В саду росли три розы
in garden grew-PL three roses-NOM
‘In the garden grew three roses.’

*Себе под нос напевал Петя
self under nose sang-MASC.SG Petja-NOM
‘To himself sang Petya.’

В квартире свистит Ваня
in apartment whistles Vanya-NOM
‘Vanya is whistling in the apartment.’

In contrast, Genitive-of-Negation is frequently used by Russian speakers in both spoken and written language. The genitive case can be used both for the direct objects of transitive verbs and the subjects of unaccusative verbs while the sentence is being negated. This grammatical case is not allowed to be used for the NPs in the subject position of transitive and transitive verbs, and with unergative verbs.

Ответ-а не пришло
Answer–GEN NEG came–NEUT.SG
'The answer didn't come.'

Студент не писал /*писало
Student.MASC-NOM NEG wrote-MASC.SG /wrote-NEUT.SG
'The student didn't write'

Владимиров не управляет фабрикой /*фабрики
Vladimirov NEG direct factory-INST /*factory-GEN
'Vladimirov doesn’t direct the factory.'

== Morphosyntactic alignment and unaccusative verbs ==
Unaccusative verbs are generally more readily identifiable in ergative-absolutive languages, such as Basque, since the subject of unaccusative verbs is inflected similarly to direct objects. By contrast, nominative-accusative languages such as Japanese mark the subject of unaccusative verbs agentively.

=== Examples in Basque ===
Edalontzi-a apurtu da.
glass-A-DEF break-PERF A3s-AUX
The glass has broken.

Jon-ek edalontzi-a apurtu du.
Jon-E glass-A-DEF break-PERF A3s-AUX-E3s
Jon has broken the glass.

In example (a), the verb apurtu is unaccusative, and the noun edalontzi appears in the object position, and is marked in the absolutive case. In example (b), the verb is transitive, and we see the subject Jon marked in the ergative case. The auxiliary verb used in either case is also different. The same case markings auxiliary variations appear in an unaccusative/unergative setting, on the same noun:

Jon-Ø etorr-i da.
John-A come-PERF be-A3s
John came

Jon-ek etsi du-Ø.
Jon-E resign-PERF have.A3s-E3s
John resigned (is desperate)

In the unaccusative setting (a), Jon is marked in the absolutive case; in the unergative setting (b), Jon is marked in the ergative case. Note, too, the auxiliary be in the unaccusative setting and the auxiliary have in the unergative setting.

=== Examples in Georgian ===
Similar to Basque, Georgian also features different markings for agent/object nouns in intransitive contexts, but the verb case remains unchanged. In unaccusative contexts (a), the noun is marked with the active case, while it is marked with the nominative case in unergative contexts.

bavšv-ma itʼira.
child-ACT 3S/cry/II
The child cried.

rezo gamoizarda.
Rezo.NOM 3S/grow/II
Rezo grew up.

== See also ==
- Active-stative alignment
- Anticausative verb – type of unaccusative
- Copula
- Deponent verb
- Ergative verb – transitive equivalent of unaccusative
- Impersonal passive voice
- Labile verb
- Reflexive verb
- Transitivity
  - Ambitransitive verb – transitive equivalent of unergative
  - Intransitive verb
  - Transitive verb
- Unergative verb – opposite of unaccusative
