= Impersonal passive voice =

Verb voice that decreases the valency of an intransitive verb

The impersonal passive voice is a verb voice that decreases the valency of an intransitive verb (which has valency one) to zero.

The impersonal passive deletes the subject of an intransitive verb. In place of the verb's subject, the construction instead may include a syntactic placeholder, also called a dummy. This placeholder has neither thematic nor referential content. (A similar example is the word "there" in the English phrase "There are three books.")

In some languages, the deleted argument can be reintroduced as an oblique argument or complement.

== Test of unergative verbs ==
In most languages that allow impersonal passives, only unergative verbs may undergo impersonal passivization. Unaccusative verbs may not. The ability to undergo this transformation is a frequently used test to distinguish unergative and unaccusative verbs. In Turkish, for example, the verb çalışmak "to work" is unergative and may therefore be passivized:

Burada çalış-ıl-ır.
here work-PASS-PRES
Here it is worked.
'Here people work.'

The verb ölmek "to die", however, is unaccusative and may not be passivized:

*Burada öl-ün-ür.
here die-PASS-PRES
Here it is died.
'Here people die.'

In a passive construction with an unergative verb, the unexpressed agent is understood to be an indefinite human agent.

== Examples ==
=== Dutch ===
The Dutch impersonal passive can be seen in the following sentences.

[De	jongens]_{s}	fluiten.
the	boys	whistle
"The boys are whistling."

Er	wordt	([door	de	jongens])	gefloten.
there	is	by	the	boys	whistled
"There is whistling (by the boys)."

=== German ===
German has an impersonal passive voice, as shown in the examples below:

Active voice:

Die Kinder spielen.
"The children play / are playing."

Impersonal passive voice:

Es wird gespielt.
It is played.
"Someone is playing."

In the latter example, the subject (Die Kinder, "the children") has been deleted, and in its place is the dummy es "it".

The sentence can be constructed without an overt subject by placing an adverbial in the first position:

Heute wird gespielt. Dort wird gespielt.
Today is played. There is played.
"Someone is playing today. Someone is playing there."

=== Venetian ===
Venetian has the impersonal passive voice, also called intransitive passive, since it is built from intransitive verbs. The verb parlar "to speak" is intransitive and takes an indirect object marked by a "to" or by co "with": although there is no direct object to be promoted to subject, the verb can be passivized becoming subjectless, i.e. impersonal. The usual auxiliary "to be" is employed, in the form xe "is" (with zero-dummy) or in the form gh'è "there is" (with gh'-dummy) depending on the local variety.

Xe stà parlà co Marco?
has DUMMY been spoken to Mark? = has someone spoken to Mark?
(Literally) "Is been spoken to Mark?"

Xe stà parlà de ti or Gh'è stà parlà de ti
DUMMY has been spoken about you = someone spoke about you
(Literally) "Is been spoken about you" or "there is been spoken about you"

Likewise, the verb tełefonar "to phone / to ring up" takes a dative indirect object in Venetian (marked by a "to"), still it is often used in the impersonal passive:

Xe stà tełefonà a Marco?
has DUMMY been phoned Mark? = has someone rung up Mark?
(Literally) "Is been phoned to Mark?"

Differently from Dutch, the subject can be introduced only with the active voice:

Gavìo parlà co Marco?
have you spoken to Mark?
(Literally) "Have-you (pl.) spoken to Mark?"

=== Latin ===
Impersonal passive constructions are quite common in Latin. While transitive verbs can appear in the impersonal passive, intransitives are much more likely to. One notable example is a phrase from Virgil:

Sic itur ad astra. (Aen. 9.641)

It is translated "thus one goes to the stars" (i.e. "such is the way to immortality") or "thus you shall go to the stars" but the word itur is the passive form of ire "to go" in the third person singular, so its literal meaning could be rendered like "this is how it gets gone to the stars."

Similarly, Saltatur is literally the third person singular passive form of the verb saltare "to dance", and it means "they (or: people) are dancing" or more precisely, "it is being danced". Pugnatum est is a perfect passive form of the verb pugnare "to fight", so this form means "they (or: people) were fighting" or "there was a fight going on" or even more precisely, "it was fought" or "it has been fought."

Another example is the answer to the question Quid agitur? (approx. "what's up?", lit. "what is being done?") in a play by Plautus: Vivitur, approx. "not too bad", literally: "one is alive" or more precisely, "it is being lived", from the impersonal (intransitive) verb vivere ("to live").

=== Slavic ===
Slavic languages have the impersonal passive, formed with the reflexive particle (the examples below are in Serbian):

Pleše se.
There's dancing.
(Literally) "It's danced."

The verb is in the third person singular (compare with Latin saltatur) As with other impersonal forms, the past tense forms are in neuter singular:

Plesalo se.
There was dancing.
(Literally) "It was danced."

No dummy pronoun can be used. There appears to be no restriction like in Turkish, e.g. the verb "to die" can be put into impersonal passive as well.

== See also ==
- Grammatical voice
- Reflexive verb
