= Labile verb =

Verb that can be used transitively or intransitively

In general linguistics, a labile verb (or ergative / diffused / ambivalent verb) is a verb that undergoes causative alternation; that is, it can be used both transitively and intransitively, with the requirement that the direct object of its transitive use corresponds to the subject of its intransitive use, as in "I ring the bell" and "The bell rings". Labile verbs are a prominent feature of English, and also occur in many other languages. This behavior can be seen as evidence that the distribution of verb classes in that language does not depend on transitivity. In this respect, it is a phenomenon that is common to both active–stative languages and ergative–absolutive languages. In such languages it is often not possible to distinguish between transitive and intransitive verbs in terms of word formation or morphology. They have the same morphological form or suffix regardless of whether they are transitive or intransitive, and the transitivity or intransitivity of the verb is determined by the context.

When causatively alternating verbs are used transitively they are called causatives since, in the transitive use of the verb, the subject is causing the action denoted by the intransitive version. When causatively alternating verbs are used intransitively, they are referred to as anticausatives or inchoatives because the intransitive variant describes a situation in which the theme participant (in this case "the bell") undergoes a change of state, becoming, for example, "rung".

== Terminology ==
The terminology in general linguistics is not stable yet. Labile verbs can also be called "S=O-ambitransitive" (following R. M. W. Dixon's usage), or "ergative", following Lyons's influential textbook from 1968. However, the term "ergative verb" has also been used for unaccusative verbs, and in most other contexts, it is used for ergative constructions.

== In English ==
Most English verbs can be used intransitively, but ordinarily this does not change the role of the subject; consider, for example, "He ate the soup" (transitive) and "He ate" (intransitive), where the only difference is that the latter does not specify what was eaten. By contrast, with a labile verb the role of the subject changes; consider "it broke the window" (transitive) and "the window broke" (intransitive).

Labile verbs can be divided into several categories:

- Verbs suggesting a change of state – break, burst, form, heal, melt, tear, transform
- Verbs of cooking – bake, boil, cook, fry
- Verbs of movement – move, shake, sweep, turn, walk
- Verbs involving vehicles – drive, fly, reverse, run, sail

Some of these can be used intransitively in either sense: "I'm cooking the pasta" is similar to both "The pasta is cooking" (as an ergative verb) and "I'm cooking", although it is clearly more informative than either.

Unlike a passive verb, a nominalization, an infinitive, or a gerund, which allow the agent to be either excluded or included, the intransitive form of a labile verb normally requires the agent to be excluded:

- "The window was broken" or "The window was broken by the burglar."
- "[...] to break the window [...]" or "[...] for the burglar to break the window [...]"
- "[...] the breaking of the window [...]" or "[...] the burglar's breaking of the window [...]"
- "The window broke" but not "The window broke by the burglar."

The intransitive form of a labile verb can suggest that there is no agent. With some non-labile verbs, this can be achieved using the reflexive voice: He solved the problem becomes The problem was solved or The problem solved itself.

The first use of the passive voice can indicate the lack of an agent, but it can also be used when a specific agent is unknown. For example, the phrases "John broke the window, or maybe Jack did – at any rate, the window broke" and "John solved the problem, or maybe Jack did – at any rate, the problem was solved" both have quite naturally understandable meanings, though they are slightly idiomatic.

The second use of the reflexive voice indicates that the subject of the sentence is the causative agent; the phrase "John solved the problem, or maybe Jack did – at any rate, the problem solved itself" is literally self-contradictory, though idiomatic usage does not always follow this prescription. Accordingly, some grammarians would consider both "The window broke" and "The problem solved itself" to be examples of a distinct voice, the middle voice.

The labile verb enables not only the omission of the outside agent, but also the implication that the affected party is somehow causing the action. This can be done neutrally when the affected party can be considered an institution or corporate entity and the individual member responsible for the action is unimportant, for example "the shop closed for the day". It can also avoid assigning blame when journalists are sympathetic to a particular causative agent, as in "Eight factories have closed this year."

=== Another example ===
Example of the causative alternation with the English verb 'break':

These trees are representations given by Schäfer

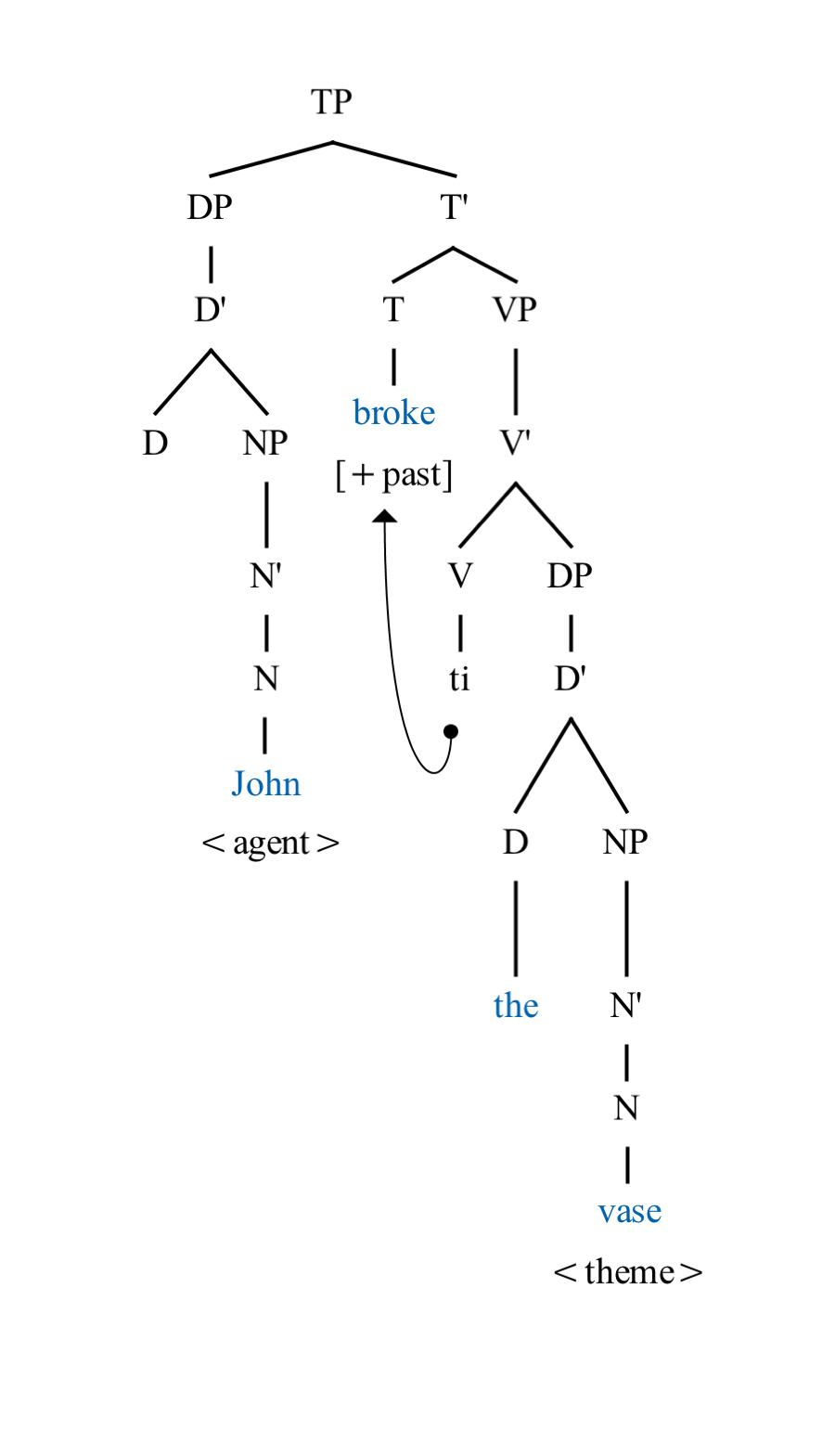
English (1a): John broke the vase

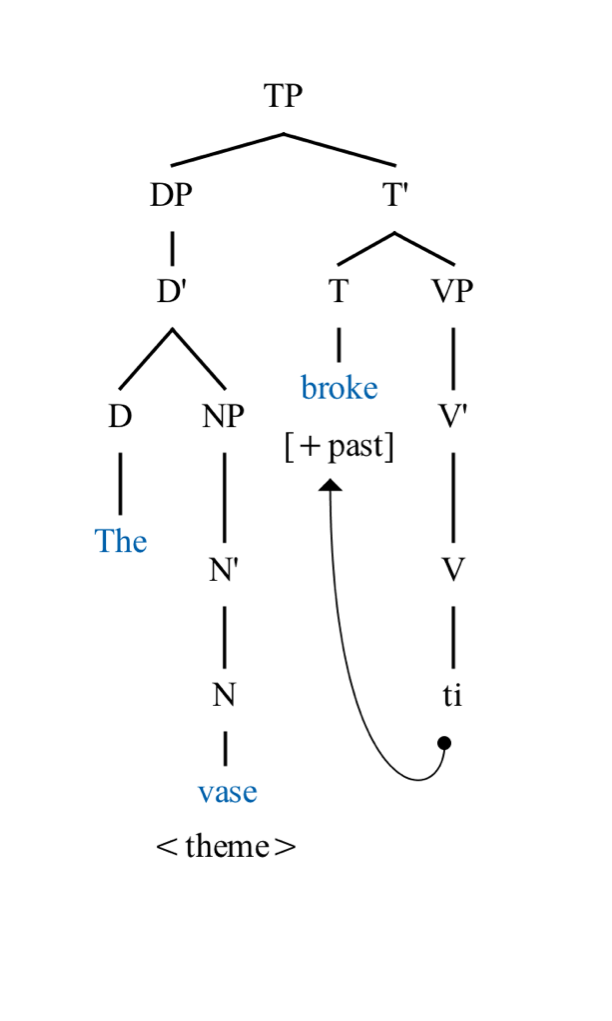
English (1b): The vase broke

- (1) English
  - (1a) Transitive use (causative): John broke the vase.
  - (1b) Intransitive use (anticausative): The vase broke.

The general structure of the causative and anticausative variants of the causative alternation in English:

- (2) Causative alternation:
  - (2a) Causative: agent Verb-transitive theme
  - (2b) Anticausative: theme Verb-intransitive

The causative alternation is a transitivity alternation. The verb “break” demonstrates causative alternation because it can alternate between transitive (in the causative) and intransitive use (in the anticausative) and the transitive alternate "John broke the vase" indicates the cause of the intransitive alternative "The vase broke." In other words, the transitive use denotes that it was John that caused the vase to break. The causative alternative has an external argument ("John"), which bears the theta role agent which is not present in the intransitive alternative. The object of the causative alternative ("the vase") bears the same thematic role of theme as the subject of the anticausative alternative (also "the vase").

== Principal characteristics ==
Cross-linguistically, the verbs that participate in the causative alternation are anticausatives which denote movement or a change of state or degree.

=== Anticausatives ===
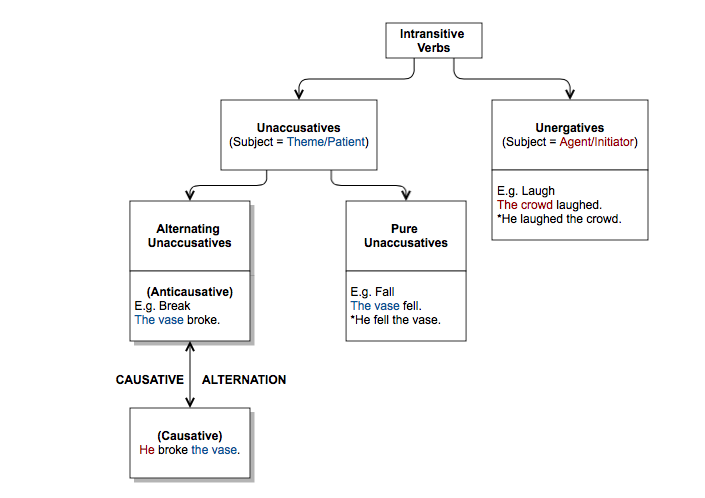
This flow chart shows that alternating unaccusatives (anticausatives) can participate in causative alternation. It is a visual representation based on information discussed in Schäfer.

Under one possible and fairly common analysis (called the unaccusative hypothesis), unaccusatives and unergatives form the two subclasses of intransitive verbs. Unaccusative verbs cannot assign case to their deep-structure object which bears the theme/patient thematic role; because of this, the object moves to the subject position in the surface form in order to obtain case in accordance with Burzio's generalization. The movement of "the book" from object position to subject position is traced in example (3a). Therefore, unaccusative verbs take a semantic theme or patient subject. On the other hand, unergative verbs take a semantic agent or initiator subject.

- (3)
  - (3a) The book_{i} fell t_{i} (unaccusative)
  - (3b) The child laughed (unergative)

Most unaccusative verbs participate in the causative alternation. The unaccusatives that do causatively alternate are anticausative verbs (like "break") which make up a subclass of unaccusative verbs called alternating unaccusatives. The other subclass of unaccusative verbs, pure unaccusatives, consists of all other unaccusatives (like "fall") that do not take part in causative alternation.

Though some unaccusative verbs can undergo causative alternation (anticausatives), it is never the case that an unergative (like "laugh") can.

- (4) Non-alternation of unergatives
  - (4a) The crowd laughed.
  - (4b) *The comedian laughed the crowd. (Intended meaning: The comedian made the crowd laugh.)

=== Change of state verbs ===
In various languages, it is seen that the verbs participating in the causative alternation are verbs that denote movement or a change of state or degree. However, not all change of state verbs are anticausatives and therefore, not all change of state verbs participate in the causative alternation. For instance, a change of state verb like 'bloom' does not show causative alternation as it is a pure unaccusative. It is possible to say that "The cactus bloomed", but it is ungrammatical to say that "The warm weather bloomed the cactus."

- (5) Examples of causatively alternating change of state verbs
  - (5a) Roll verbs: "roll", "bounce", "swing"
  - (5b) Break verbs: "break", "chip", "crack"
  - (5c) Bend verbs: "bend", "crease", "crinkle"
  - (5d) Amuse-type psych verbs: "cheer", "delight", "thrill"
  - (5e) Zero-related to adjective verbs: "blunt", "clear", "clean"
  - (5f) Change of color verbs: "blacken", "redden", "grey"
  - (5g) -en verbs: "awaken", "brighten", "broaden"
  - (5h) -ify verbs: "solidify", "stratify", "emulsify"
  - (5i) -ize verbs: "democratize", "decentralize", "crystallize"
  - (5j) -ate verbs: "accelerate", "ameliorate", "operate"
- (6) Examples of non-causatively alternating change of state verbs
  - (6a) Change of possession verbs: "give", "donate", "owe"
  - (6b) Cutting verbs: "cut", "carve", "slice"
  - (6c) Contact by impact verbs: "hit", "swat", "bludgeon"
  - (6d) Touch verbs: "caress", "graze", "touch"
  - (6e) Destroy verbs: "annihilate", "decimate", "destroy"
  - (6f) Killing verbs: "kill", "shoot", "eliminate"
  - (6g) Verbs of appearance, disappearance, and occurrence: "appear", "disappear", "occur"

== Theoretical approaches ==
The general consensus in the field is that there is a derivational relationship between verbs undergoing the causative alternation that share the same lexical entry. From this it follows that there is uncertainty surrounding which form, the intransitive or the transitive, is the base from which the other is derived. Another matter of debate is whether the derivation takes place at the syntactic or lexical level.

With reference to these assumptions, syntactic and lexicalist accounts have been proposed. These approaches account for intransitive, transitive and common base approaches.

The intransitive base approaches, also known as causativization, state that the transitive variant is derived from the intransitive variant (the causative is derived from the anticausative) by adding one argument, that is an agent. The transitive base approaches, also known as decausativization, propose that the intransitive form is derived from the transitive by deleting one argument that is the agent. Common base approaches suggest that both the transitive and the intransitive forms are formulated from a common base.

=== Lexicalist ===
According to the intransitive base/causativization approach, the intransitive form is the base and a causative predicate is added to the Lexical Conceptual Structure (LCS) in order to make the verb transitive. In the following example (7), the basic LCS, "The stick broke" is embedded under a cause predicate, in this case "Katherine", to form the derived LCS "Katherine broke the stick."

- (7) Causativization rule
  - [(x) CHANGE] ⇒ [(y) CAUSE [(x) CHANGE]]
- (7a) Example of causativization
  - The stick broke ⇒ Katherine broke the stick
  - (the stick) CHANGE ⇒ [(Katherine) CAUSE [(the stick) CHANGE]]

In (7a), "x" is the variable ("stick"), and the CHANGE operator refers to the change-of-state ("break"). In the anticausative ("the stick broke") "the stick" undergoes the change "break", namely, the stick breaks. Moreover, the "y" variable refers to "Katherine" and the CAUSE operator refers to the cause of the change ("break"). In the causative, ("Katherine broke the stick"), it is "Katherine" who causes the action "break", and is therefore the cause operator.

The transitive/decausativation approach, assumes a lexical operation which performs precisely the opposite of the causativization approach discussed above.

In this approach, according to the following rule, the intransitive/anticausative form is derived from the transitive/causative form by deleting the cause predicate from the LCS. In example (8) below, the LCS is "Katherine broke the stick" and the cause predicate "Katherine" is deleted.

- (8) Decausativization rule
  - [(y) CAUSE [(x) CHANGE]] ⇒ [(x) CHANGE]
  - (8a) Example of decausativization
  - Katherine broke the stick. ⇒ The stick broke.
  - [(Katherine) CAUSE [(the stick) CHANGE]] ⇒ [(the stick) CHANGE]

=== Syntactic ===
Under a syntactic intransitive base approach, the transitive form is derived from the intransitive form by insertion of a verbal layer projected by a head expressing causation and introducing the external agent argument. This idea assumes that a verbal phrase is able to be separated into different layers of verbal projections whereby each of the layers provide a specifier where an argument can be attached. In addition, the layers are joined by head movement of the lowest verb head to positions higher in the syntactic structure. Change-of-state verbs are broken-down into the verbal layers of initiation phrase (initP), process phrase (procP) and result phrase (resP), which approximately correspond to the predicate cause, become, and state respectively.

Example (9a), the anticausative variant, is basic according to the intransitive base approach. The theme ("the stick") is initially merged into the specifier of resP and that it then moves to the specifier of procP. The theme ("stick") is therefore given a complex theta-role of both the result and the undergoer of the event. In the syntax, the causative form is derived through the addition of an init-head, which introduces the external initiator argument ("Katherine") in example (9b).

These trees illustrate a syntactic account.

(9a) The stick broke (anticausative)

(9b) Katherine broke the stick (causative)

=== Connecting the lexical and syntactic analyses ===
The syntactic and lexical analyses correspond in the following ways:

In the lexical accounts, the causative alternation takes place at the level of the lexical conceptual structure (LCS), while in the syntactic accounts, the alternation happens at the level of the syntax, as a result of the interaction between the syntactic structure and the basic verbal element.

In the lexical accounts [x CHANGE] corresponds with the layered process phrase (procP) and the result phrase (resP) in the syntactic account. The [y CAUSE [x CHANGE]] in the lexical accounts corresponds with the process phrase (procP), the result P (resP) along with initiator phrase (initP), which is the additional verbal layer in the syntactic account. The presence of this additional verbal layer (initP) is what distinguishes the causative/transitive variant from the anticausative/instransitive variant in the syntactic account. In contrast, in the lexical accounts, the causative is determined by the presence of a causative predicate ([y CAUSE]).

== Child language acquisition ==
Children typically begin to generate causatively alternating verbs around the age of 1;11 (years;months). Around this time the causative alternations closely resemble an adult-like form; however, around the age of 2;6 to 12;0 children begin making common errors of overregularization, in which they erroneously overuse the causative. Children often acquire the syntactic pattern that goes along with verbal alternations; however, that does not mean that they acquire the lexical semantic restrictions that accompany these alternations. Three common overregulizations include:

- (29a) Fixed intransitive verbs as transitive verbs:
  - *"Look at me swim her" [make her swim]
    - In (29a), children are incorrectly using a causative/transitive structure with a fixed intransitive verb ("swim").
- (29b) Fixed transitive verbs produced in intransitive contexts
  - *"The snake cutted in half. [It cut in half]
    - In (29b) children are mistakenly employing a causative/transitive verb ("cut") in an intransitive environment, where "cut" has the meaning of 'separate in half'.
  - (29c) Suppletive verb substitutions which have different lexical items to show cause:
    - *"Stay it there!" [keep it there]

In (29c), children are erroneously using fixed intransitive verbs (such as "stay") in environments where fixed transitive verbs (such as "keep") would be used.

In language acquisition, once children establish that a particular transitivity alternation is productive, they often extend the alternation to new verbs, despite the argument structure of the individual verb. It has been suggested that causative alternation errors come from three sources:

- Lexical rules being applied too broadly, thus not recognizing the narrow semantic restrictions of verbs
- Reflections of retrieval errors, where the wrong verb stem is retrieved under discourse pressure
- Immature rule system, where the absence of the adult rule leads to errors in productions.

When acquiring causatively alternating verbs children must learn both the semantic representation and the argument structure of each verb to produce grammatical sentences. It has been suggested that children learn this is through the no negative evidence problem; for example a child will learn that the verb 'throw' can never be used in a subject position: *"the ball threw".

=== In children with specific language impairments ===
Children with specific language impairments (SLI) tend to produce less mature responses (i.e., different verb and adjectival) and fewer mature responses (periphrastics and passives) compared to children of the same age comparison (AC). The children with SLI produced slightly fewer overgeneralizations, but in general, did not appear to differ in frequency or type of overgeneralizations when compared to the AC children. In English, children need to be able to organize verbs into three separate syntactic groups in order to properly use causative alternations. These syntactic groups include:

1. Fixed intransitives
2. Fixed transitives
3. Causatives

While children with SLI can typically use the lexical alternation for causative alternation as well as AC children, they tend to have difficulty using the syntactic cues to deal with verbs with fixed transitivity.

== Other languages ==
=== Indo-European languages ===
In many Indo-European languages, causative alternation regularly involves the use of a reflexive pronoun, clitic, or affix in the inchoative use of the verb. A reflexive pronoun is a pronoun that is preceded by the noun, adjective, adverb or pronoun to which it refers (its antecedent) within the same clause.

==== French ====
French is another language that has them, developed from lack of distinguished sense in Gallo-Roman Vulgar Latin:

- "Il tourne la tête." ("He turns his head.")
- "Sa tête tourne." ("His head turns.")

However, note that the use of the reflexive form of the verb to express the anticausative meaning is more common.

- "J'ouvre la porte." ("I open the door.")
- "La porte s'ouvre." ("The door opens itself", i.e. "The door opens.")

Further, verbs analogous to English cook have even more possibilities, even allowing a causative construction to substitute for the transitive form of the verb:

- "Je cuis les pâtes." ("I cook the pasta.")
- "Je cuis." ("I cook", i.e. either "I cook [something]" or e.g. "It's so hot in here, I'm practically roasting.")
- "Je fais cuire les pâtes." (lit., "I make cook the pasta", i.e. "I make the pasta cook", i.e. "I cook the pasta.")
- "Les pâtes cuisent." ("The pasta cooks.")

French is a Romance language which incorporates the use of a reflexive pronoun with a verb's inchoative form.

Seen in (10) is the causative use of the verb "briser", conjugated in present tense.

Caroline brise les bouteilles.
Caroline breaks the bottles
"Caroline breaks the bottles."

Seen in (11) is the anticausative use of the verb.

Les bouteilles *(se) brisent.
the bottles REFL break
"The bottles are breaking."

Note the use of the reflexive pronoun "se" in (11), which is required for the sentence to be grammatically correct in French.

==== Italian ====
Italian is another Romance language that, like French, incorporates the use of a reflexive pronoun with a verb's inchoative form.

Seen in (12) is the causative use of the verb "chiudere" conjugated in past tense.

Gianni ha chiuso la finestra.
Gianni have closed the window
"Gianni closed the window."

Seen in (13) is the anticausative use of the verb.

La finestra *(si) è chiusa.
the window REFL is closed
"The window closed."

Note the use of the reflexive pronoun "si" in (13), which behaves in the same manner as the French "se" shown in example (11).

==== German ====
It is common for languages to use a reflexive marker to signal the inchoative member of an alternating pair of verbs. Inchoative verbs in German are marked either by the reflexive pronoun sich (in third person), or not marked at all.

Shown in examples (14) and (15) is a verb that alternates without any use of a reflexive pronoun:

Seen in (14) is the causative use of the verb zerbrechen, conjugated in past tense.

Rebecca zerbrach den Bleistift.
Rebecca broke the pencil
"Rebecca broke the pencil."

Seen in (15) is the anticausative use of the verb.

Der Bleistift zerbrach.
the pencil broke
"The pencil broke."

Seen in examples (16) and (17) is an example of a verb that requires a reflexive pronoun to denote the anticausative:

Seen in (16) is the causative use of the verb öffnen, conjugated in past tense. There is no reflexive pronoun present; it is not needed in the causative use.

Maria öffnete die Tür.
Maria opened the door
"Maria opened the door."

This is the causative use of the verb.

Seen in (17) is the anticausative use of the verb.

Die Tür öffnete sich.
the door open REFL
"The door opened."

Note the use of the reflexive pronoun sich in (17), which behaves in the same manner as French se and Italian si seen above in examples (11) and (13).

==== Dutch ====
In Dutch, labile verbs are used in a way similar to English, but they stand out as more distinct particularly in the perfect tenses.

In the present, the usage in both languages is similar, for example:

Jan breekt zijn glas.
John breaks-3SG-PRES his glass
"John breaks his glass."

*Het glas breekt.
The glass breaks-3SG-PRES
"The glass breaks."

However, there are cases where the two languages deviate. For example, the verb zinken (to sink) cannot be used transitively, nor the verb openen (to open) intransitively:

Het schip zonk.
The ship sank-3SG-PRET
"The ship sank."

- Not *De marine zonk het schip. (Unlike "The navy sank the ship.")

and

Jan opent de deur.
Jan opens-3SG-PRES the door
"John opens the door."

- Not *"De deur opent." (Unlike "The door opens.")

Instead, one could say:

De deur gaat open.
The door goes-3SG-PRES open
"The door opens."

De marine liet het schip zinken.
The navy let-3SG-PRET the ship sink-INF
"The navy sank the ship."

A difference between Dutch and English is that typically the perfect tenses of intransitives take zijn (to be) as their auxiliary rather than hebben (to have), and this extends to these verbs as well.

- present:
  - Hij breekt het glas.
    He breaks-3SG-PRES the glass
    "He breaks the glass."
  - Het glas breekt.
    The glass breaks-3SG-PRES
    "The glass breaks."
- perfect:
  - Hij heeft het glas gebroken.
    He has-3SG-PRES the glass broken-PP
    "He has broken the glass."
  - Het glas is gebroken.
    The glass is-3SG-PRES broken-PP
    "The glass has broken." or "The glass is broken."

===== Perfect labile innocence =====
Labiles are verbs of innocence, because they imply the absence of an actor who could possibly be blamed. This association is quite strong in Dutch and speakers tend to treat verbs such as forgetting and losing as ergatives in the perfect tenses even though they typically have a direct object and are really transitive verbs. It is not unusual to hear sentences such as:

Ik ben mijn boek vergeten.
I am-1SG-PRES my book forgotten-PP
"I forgot my book" (and it just 'happened' to me: there is no actor).

Ik ben mijn geld verloren.
I am-1SG-PRES my money lost-PP
"I lost my money" (poor me).

Something similar happens with compound verbs such as gewaarworden ('become aware (of something)'). It is a separable compound of worden ('become'), which is a typical 'process'-verb. It is usually considered a copula, rather than an ergative, but these two groups of verbs are related. For example, copulas usually take to be in the perfect as well. A verb such as blijven ('stay') is used both as a copula and as an ergative and all its compounds (nablijven ('stay behind'), bijblijven ('keep up'), aanblijven ('stay on') etc.) are ergatives.

Gewaarworden can take two objects, a reflexive indirect one and one that could be called a causative object. In many languages the causative object would take a case such as the genitive, but in Dutch this is no longer the case:

Ik werd me dat gewaar.
I became-1SG-PRET REFL-1SG that aware
"I became aware of that."

The perfect usually takes zijn regardless of the objects:

Ik ben me dat niet gewaargeworden.
I am-1SG-PRES REFL-1SG that not aware-become-PP
(roughly) "I did not catch on to that."

==== Norwegian ====
The labile verbs in Norwegian have one conjugation pattern for the transitive form and another for the intransitive form:

Nøtta knakk
Nut-SG-DEF cracked-3SG-PRET
"The nut cracked."

Jeg knekte nøtta
I cracked-3SG-PRET nut-SG-DEF
"I cracked the nut."

=== Hebrew ===
Hebrew does have a few labile verbs, due in part to calques from other languages; nonetheless, it has fewer labile verbs than English, in part because it has a fairly productive causative construction and partly distinct mediopassive constructions. For example, the verbs שָׁבַר [ʃaˈvaʁ] (active) and נִשְׁבַּר [niʃˈbaʁ] (its mediopassive counterpart) both mean to break, but the former is transitive (as in "He broke the window") and the latter is intransitive (as in "The window broke"). Similarly, the verbs לַעֲבֹר [la(ʔ)aˈvoʁ] (active) and לְהַעֲבִיר [laha(ʔ)aˈviʁ] (its causative counterpart) both mean to pass, but the former is intransitive (as in "He passed by Susan") and the latter is transitive (as in "He passed the salt to Susan").

=== Japanese ===
In Japanese, causative alternation is seen in labile verbs and paired verbs. Labile verbs are verbs that can be transitive or intransitive without morphological change, while paired verbs are verbs that require morphological changes in order to be read as transitive or intransitive.

An example of a labile verb in Japanese is shown below in examples (18) and (19).

Seen in (18) is the causative use of the verb "開く" – hiraku, conjugated in the past-tense form hiraita.

太郎が、 扉を 開いた.
Taro-ga tobira-o hiraita
Taro-NOM door-ACC opened
"Taro opened the door."

Seen in (19) is the anticausative use of the verb.

扉が 開いた.
Tobira-ga hiraita
Door-NOM opened
"The door opened."

Note that in (18) and (19), the form of the verb does not undergo any sort of morphological change, making "開く" a labile verb.

An example of a paired verb in Japanese is shown below in examples (20) and (21):

In (20), the verb "to drop" takes on the verb form "落とす" – otosu, conjugated in the past-tense form otoshita. The verb "落とす" requires an agent to physically drop an object.

平次が 銭を おとした.
Heiji-ga zeni-o otoshita
Heiji-NOM coin-ACC dropped
"Heiji dropped the coin."

In (21), the verb "to drop" takes on the verb form "落ちる" – ochiru, conjugated in the past-tense form ochita. The verb "落ちる" is used when something happens on its own and there is no agent, and/or the agent is the one undergoing the action of the verb.

銭が おちた.
Zeni-ga ochita
Coin-NOM dropped
"The coin dropped."

=== Chinese ===
Mandarin Chinese is a language that lacks inflectional morphology that marks tense, case, agreement, or lexical category. The language also does not have derivational morphology to mark the transitivity of verbs. Instead, Mandarin Chinese uses verbal compounding to do causative alternation.

Seen in (22) is the anticausative use of the verb "碎" (suì).

窗子 碎了.
Chuāngzi suì-le.
window break-PRT
"The window broke."

The following examples (23) and (24) show an ungrammatical use of the causative alternative of the verb "碎" - suì.

*老张 碎了 窗子.
Lǎozhāng suì-le chuāngzi.
Laozhang break-PRT window
Intended meaning: 'Laozhang broke the window.'

老张 打碎了 窗子 /老张 把窗子 打碎了.
Lǎozhāng dǎ-suì-le chuāngzi /Lǎozhāng bǎ-chuāngzi dǎ-suì-le.
Laozhang hit-break-PRT window {} {} {}
"Laozhang broke the window."

(23) and (24) show that in order for Laozhang to have broken the window, he has to have completed an action in order for it to break. In (23), there is no action that Laozhang performed to cause the window to break, making this sentence ungrammatical. In (24), he hit the window.

=== Korean ===
Causative alternation in Korean is difficult to interpret. There have been many attempts to capture the restrictions on Korean causative alternation, but none of them capture the restrictions entirely.

Some verbs in Korean bear similarities to the paired verbs in Japanese. Morphological changes take place in order to show transitivity and intransitivity.

Shown in (25) is the causative use of the verb "열다" – yeolda, "to open", conjugated in the past-tense form yeoreotda.

내가 문을 열었다.
nae-ga mun-eul yeoreotda
I-NOM door-ACC opened
"I opened the door."

Shown in (26) is the anticausative use of the verb, based on the anticausative form "열리다" - yeollida, conjugated in the past-tense form yeollyeotda.

문이 열렸다.
mun-i yeollyeotda
door-NOM opened
"The door opened."

In examples (25) and (26), it is seen that the infinitive (unconjugated) forms of the verb "yeolda" are the same, but causative and anticausative forms take on different conjugated forms in order to show causativity.

As an alternative analysis, the base verb "열다" – yeolda is inherently semantically causative/transitive, and "열리다" - yeollida is the anticausative/intransitive form, including the valency-changing infix "-리-" - -li-.

Korean also bears similarities to Chinese in its verbal compounding.

Shown in (27) and (28) is an example of a verb that requires compounding in order to be grammatical in the causative use.

Seen in (27) is the anticausative use of the verb "죽다" – jukda, conjugated in the past-tense form jugeotda.

철수는 죽었다.
Cheolsu-neun jugeotda
Cheolsu-TOP died
"Cheolsu died."

Seen in (28) is the causative use of the verb, based on the causative form "죽이다" - jugida, conjugated in the past-tense honorific form jugyeotsumnda.

경찰은 철수를 죽였습니다.
gyeongchar-eun cheolsu-reul jugyeotseumnida
police-TOP Cheolsu-ACC died-made
"The police killed (made dead) Cheolsu."

Example (28) shows that the verb jukda behaves similarly to the verb suì in Mandarin Chinese seen in example (24) in that the verb requires some sort of action performed by the agent.

As an alternative analysis, the base verb "죽다" – jukda is inherently semantically anticausative/intransitive, and "죽이다" - jugida is the causative/transitive form, including the valency-changing infix "-이-" - -i-.

== See also ==
- Active language
- Ambitransitive verb
- Unaccusative verb
- Unergative verb
