= Mediopassive voice =

Grammatical voice

The mediopassive voice is a grammatical voice that subsumes the meanings of both the middle voice and the passive voice.

== Description ==
Languages of the Indo-European family (and many others) typically have two or three of the following voices: active, middle, and passive. "Mediopassive" may be used to describe a category that covers both the middle (or "medium") and the passive voice. In synchronic grammars, the mediopassive voice is often simply termed either "middle" (typical for grammars of e.g. Ancient and Modern Greek) or "passive" (typical for grammars of e.g. modern Danish).

In the oldest Indo-European languages, the distinction active/middle was the most important, whereas the development in later languages has generally been to replace the old distinction with (or to reinterpret it as) an active/passive distinction (e.g. modern English: to tease / to be teased). The Proto-Indo-European language itself is typically reconstructed as having two voices, active and mediopassive, where the middle-voice element in the mediopassive voice was dominant. Ancient Greek also had a mediopassive in the present, imperfect, perfect, and pluperfect tenses, but in the aorist and future tenses the mediopassive voice was replaced by two voices, one middle and one passive. Only Modern Greek and Albanian retain mediopassive in all tenses.

A number of Indo-European languages have developed a new middle or mediopassive voice. Often this derives from a periphrastic form involving the active verb combined with a reflexive pronoun. This development happened independently in the Romance languages, the Slavic languages, and the North Germanic (Scandinavian) languages. North Germanic languages, and East Slavic languages, have fused the reflexive with the verb to form a new synthetic conjugation, whereas in the Romance languages the reflexive mostly remains separate.

== Usage ==
The mediopassive can have many meanings depending on the context of the sentence.

1. Reflexive mediopassive. In Proto-Indo-European and the languages which descend from it, verbs that also had an active form could use the mediopassive in a reflexive sense, e.g. "I wash (myself)". This reflexive sense could also carry a sense of benefaction for the subject, as in the sentence "I sacrificed a goat (for my own benefit)." These constructions would have used the active form of "sacrificed" when the action was performed for some reason other than the subject's benefit.
2. Reciprocal mediopassive. The mediopassive can also be used in a reciprocal sense, e.g. "to fight" (with active) vs. "to fight each other" (with mediopassive).
3. Autocausative mediopassive describes situations where the subject causes itself to change state.
4. In stative verbs. Some languages always used the mediopassive with verbs relating to standing, sitting, reclining, being afraid, being ashamed, and being pleased, which did not have an active form.
5. Intensive mediopassive. Classical Greek also used the mediopassive in an intensive sense, e.g. "to be a citizen" (with active) vs. "to do the duties of being a citizen" (with middle).
6. In deponent verbs. Greek and Sanskrit both had the verb "to follow" in the mediopassive only. Latin had the form sequitur ("It follows"; -tur is the mediopassive present 3rd person singular from PIE *-tor) with the same usage. In all three languages, the word "to follow" came from the same Proto-Indo-European root.
7. The mediopassive was combined with the subjunctive to form the future tense of the verb "to be" in Classical Greek.
8. The mediopassive can also be used as a passive form, especially when the mediopassive endings are combined with a specialized passive verb. This was very common in Sanskrit.

== Examples ==
=== English ===
A few examples of unaccusative verbs in English with meanings similar to a mediopassive:

- The book reads well.
- The trousers wash easily.
- Ripe oranges peel well.
- The book was not selling.

=== Spanish ===
Spanish is an example of a modern language with a mediopassive voice, normally indicated by the use of a reflexive pronoun. This can variously have a middle-voice meaning (subject acting onto itself, or for its own benefit) or a passive-voice meaning (something acts onto the subject).

An example sentence is El padre se enojó al ver a su hijo romper la lámpara. The English translation is "The father became angry upon seeing his son break the lamp.". The verb se enojó is said to be mediopassive because it comprises the reflexive pronoun se and the simple verb enojó, which together literally mean "angered himself". This would be literally translated "The father angered himself upon seeing his son break the lamp.". Pragmatics quickly rejects the middle-voice meaning for the intended mediopassive-voice meaning, translated above as "got angry," because the middle-voice is rarely used. Many intransitive Spanish verbs behave that way: me caí, I fell; me cansé, I became tired.

=== Serbo-Croatian ===
Serbo-Croatian and other Slavic languages are very similar in this respect to Spanish, employing the same constructs with the passive/reflexive particle se: Otac se razljutio kad je njegov sin razbio svjetiljku. This would be again literally translated "The father angered himself when his son broke the lamp." Similar constructs are Svjetiljka se razbila "The lamp broke" and Vrata su se zatvorila "The door closed." However, not all verbs permit such use.

The (medio)passive is used when one is unable or does not want to express the actor: Čaša se razbila "The glass broke", implying it "just happened", almost "on its own".

=== North Germanic ===
The mediopassive is found in some contemporary North Germanic languages like Danish, Swedish, Norwegian and Icelandic.

The examples below are from Danish, but the situation is the same in Swedish and Norwegian, and sometimes in Icelandic. Icelandic contains a grammatical active, passive and mediopassive (I was seen could be expressed as passive ég var séð/ur or mediopassive ég sást, for example). The passive use of the Danish mediopassive is probably predominant, but the medial use is quite frequent as well. Here are examples of sub-categories of the middle voice.

1. Reflexive: Jeg mindes min ungdom ("I remember my youth"/"I'm reminded of my youth"). The form mindes is usually called passive, but the meaning is medial. The present active minder means "remind(s)". Historically, mindes is a contraction of the active forms and the reflexive pronoun: hun minder sig ("she reminds herself") → hun mindes ("she remembers"). "She" is both the agent and the patient, so the expression works in much the same way as reflexive middle forms of ancient Indo-European languages like Greek and Sanskrit.
2. Reciprocal: Vi ses is the everyday expression equivalent in Danish to the English "See you." The present active is vi ser (we see); the mediopassive (commonly called passive) form is historically derived thus: de ser sig ("they see themselves") → de ses ("they are seen" or "they see themselves/see each other"). The third person forms have since been generalized by analogy to the first and second person, and as the future progressive is often expressed with simple present in Danish, the meaning is, "We'll be seeing each other." Icelandic is the same, it's present active is við sjáum, with the mediopassive phrase being við sjáumst.
3. Autocausative: Han glædes over sin gave ("He gets/is happy with his gift"), from Han glæder sig over sin gave.

=== Armenian ===
Classical Armenian had a mediopassive form that was marked by changing the verb's thematic vowel instead of with a unique conjugation like in other Indo-European languages. Modern Armenian has retained some of these active/mediopassive pairs, but the distinction between the two voices is no longer productive.

== See also ==
- Reflexive verb
- Voice (grammar)
