= Reflexive verb =

Verb whose direct object is the same as its subject

In grammar, a reflexive verb is, loosely, a verb whose direct object is the same as its subject, for example, "I wash myself". More generally, a reflexive verb has the same semantic agent and patient (typically represented syntactically by the subject and the direct object). For example, the English verb to perjure is reflexive, since one can only perjure oneself. In a wider sense, the term refers to any verb form whose grammatical object is a reflexive pronoun, regardless of semantics; such verbs are also more broadly referred to as pronominal verbs, especially in the grammar of the Romance languages. Other kinds of pronominal verbs are reciprocal (they killed each other), passive (it is told), subjective, and idiomatic. The presence of the reflexive pronoun changes the meaning of a verb, e.g., Spanish abonar 'to pay', abonarse 'to subscribe'.

There are languages that have explicit morphology or syntax to transform a verb into a reflexive form. In many languages, reflexive constructions are rendered by transitive verbs followed by a reflexive pronoun, as in English -self (e.g., "She threw herself to the floor."). English employs reflexive derivation idiosyncratically as well, as in "self-destruct".

== Indo-European languages ==
Romance and Slavic languages make extensive use of reflexive verbs and reflexive forms.

In the Romance languages, there are nonemphatic clitic reflexive pronouns and emphatic ones. In Spanish, for example, the particle se encliticizes to the verb's infinitive, gerund, and imperative (lavarse 'to wash oneself'), while in Romanian, the particle procliticizes to the verb (a se spăla 'to wash oneself'). Full reflexive pronouns or pronominal phrases are added for emphasis or disambiguation: Me cuido a mí mismo "I take care of myself" (mismo '-self, same' combines with the prepositional form of the pronoun mí 'my' to form an intensive reflexive pronoun).

The enclitic reflexive pronoun sa/se/si/się is used in Western and South Slavic languages, while Eastern Slavic languages use the suffix -sja (-ся). There is also the non-clitic emphatic pronoun sebja/себя, used to emphasize the reflexive nature of the act; it is applicable only to "true" reflexive verbs, where the agent performs a (transitive) action on itself.

The Slavic languages use the same reflexive pronoun for all persons and numbers, while the Romance and North Germanic ones have a special third person pronoun that cliticizes and the other Germanic ones do as well without cliticizing. This is illustrated in the following table for the word "to recall" (e.g., Je me souviens means "I recall", Tu te souviens means "You recall", and so on).

		French	Danish	Serbo-Croatian
1st person	Singular	Je me souviens	Jeg lægger mig	Ja se sjećam
1st person	Plural	Nous nous souvenons	Vi lægger os	Mi se sjećamo
2nd person	Singular	Tu te souviens	Du lægger dig	Ti se sjećaš
2nd person	Plural	Vous vous souvenez	I lægger jer	Vi se sjećate
3rd person	Singular	Il se souvient	Han lægger sig	On se sjeća
3rd person	Plural	Ils se souviennent	De lægger sig	Oni se sjećaju

In all of these language groups, reflexive forms often present an obstacle for foreign learners (notably native speakers of English, where the feature is practically absent) due to the variety of uses. Even in languages which contain the feature, it is not always applicable to the same verbs and uses (although a common subset can be generally extracted, as outlined below). For example, the Spanish reflexive construct "se hundió el barco" ("the boat sank") has no reflexive equivalent in some Slavic languages (which use an intransitive equivalent of sink), though for example Czech and Slovak do use a reflexive verb: "loď se potopila"/"loď sa potopila". Reflexive verbs can have a variety of uses and meanings, which often escape consistent classification. Some language-common identified uses are outlined below. For example, Davies et al. identify 12 uses for Spanish reflexive constructions, while Vinogradov divides Russian reflexive verbs into as many as 16 groups.

Martin Haspelmath also has a useful distinction between the reflexive types mentioned below, which he calls introverted reflexives, and so-called extroverted reflexives, which are used for verbs that are usually not reflexive, like hate oneself, love oneself, hear oneself, and kill oneself. Some Indo-European languages have a different reflexive morpheme for extroverted reflexives. For example:

- The Russian ненавидеть себя (nenavidet' sebja) "to hate oneself", which uses a reflexive pronoun, compares to мыться (myt'-sja) "to wash (oneself)", which uses a reflexive suffix (Russian can also say мыть себя (myt' sebja), with a reflexive pronoun, but only when the pronoun needs to be stressed for emphasis or contrast).
- Or Dutch "zij haat zichzelf" "she hates herself", versus "zij wast zich" "she washes (herself)".
- The distinction exists similarly in English, where introverted reflexive verbs usually have no reflexive pronoun, unlike extroverted.
- In ancient Greek, the introverted reflexive was expressed using the middle voice rather than a pronoun. Similarly, in modern Greek, it is expressed using the middle usage of the mediopassive voice. On the other hand, the extroverted reflexive was a true reflexive in ancient Greek and modern Greek.
- Similarly, Claire Moyse-Faurie distinguishes between middle and reflexive in Oceanic languages.

=== Properly reflexive ===
The "true" (literal) reflexive denotes that the agent is simultaneously the patient. The verb is typically transitive and can be used in non-reflexive meaning as well.

Language	Examples	Compare
English	Peter washes [himself].	Peter washes the cat.
French	Pierre se lave. (Verb: se laver)	Pierre lave le chat.
Spanish	Pedro se lava. (Verb: lavarse)	Pedro lava el gato.
Portuguese	O Pedro lava-se. (Verb: lavar)	O Pedro lava o gato.
Italian	Pietro si lava.	Pietro lava il gatto.
Catalan	En Pere es renta.	En Pere renta el gat.
Galician	Pedro lávase.	Pedro lava o gato.
Romanian	Petre se spală.	Petre spală pisica.
Serbo-Croatian	Petar se kupa.	Petar kupa mačku.
Slovene	Peter se umiva.	Peter umiva mačko.
Bulgarian	Петър се мие. Petăr se mie.	Петър мие котката. Petăr mie kotkata.
Polish	Piotr się kąpie.	Piotr kąpie kota.
Russian	Пётр моется. Pjotr mojetsja.	Пётр моет кота. Pjotr mojet kota.
German	Peter wäscht sich.	Peter wäscht die Katze.
Danish	Peter vasker sig.	Peter vasker katten.
Swedish	Peter tvättar sig.	Peter tvättar katten.
Lithuanian	Petras prausiasi.	Petras prausia katę.
Lithuanian	Petras prausia save.	Petras prausia katę.
Czech	Petr se koupe.	Petr koupe kočku.
Turkish	Peter yıkanıyor.	Peter kediyi yıkıyor.

=== Reciprocal ===
"Reciprocal" reflexive denotes that the agents perform the mutual actions among themselves, as in English constructions using "each other". In most cases, the transitive verbs are also used.

Language	Examples	Compare
English	Mary and Peter kiss [each other].	Mary kisses Peter.
French	Marie et Pierre s'embrassent	Marie embrasse Pierre
Spanish	María y Pedro se besan (Infinitive: besarse).	María besa a Pedro.
Portuguese	A Maria e o Pedro beijam-se (Verb: beijar).	A Maria beija o Pedro.
Italian	Maria e Pietro si baciano.	Maria bacia Pietro.
Catalan	La Maria i en Pere es fan un petó.	La Maria fa un petó a en Pere.
Galician	María e Pedro bícanse.	María bica a Pedro.
Romanian	Maria și Petre se sărută.	Maria îl sărută pe Petre.
Serbo-Croatian	Marija i Petar se ljube.	Marija ljubi Petra.
Slovene	Marija in Petar se poljubita.	Marija poljubi Petra.
Bulgarian	Мария и Петър се целуват. Mariya i Petăr se celuvat.	Мария целува Петър. Mariya celuva Petăr.
Polish	Maria i Piotr się całują.	Maria całuje Piotra.
Russian	Мария и Пётр целуются. Marija i Pjotr celujutsja.	Мария целует Петра. Marija celujet Petra.
Danish	Maria og Peter kysser hinanden.	Maria kysser Peter.
German	Maria und Peter küssen sich (/ küssen einander).	Maria küsst Peter.
Lithuanian	Marija ir Petras bučiuojasi.	Marija bučiuoja Petrą.
Hebrew	מאיה ופאר מתנשקים. Maya ve-Pe'er mitnashkim.	מאיה מנשקת את פאר. Maya menasheket et Pe'er.

In modern Scandinavian languages, the passive (or more properly mediopassive) voice is used for medial, especially reciprocal, constructions. Some examples from Danish are:

Maria og Peter skændes; "Mary and Peter are bickering", lit. "Mary and Peter are scolded by each other."

Maria og Peter blev forlovet; "Mary and Peter got engaged [to each other]."

(The hypothetical form **kysses (kiss each other) is not often—if ever—seen in Danish; however, it will likely be understood by most native speakers, indicating that the mediopassive voice is still at the very least potentially productive in Danish. An expression like "de kysses uafladeligt" (they kiss each other all the time) could very well be used for humorous purposes.)

=== Autocausative ===
"Autocausative" reflexive denotes that the (usually animate) "referent represented by the subject combines the activity of actor and undergoes a change of state as a patient":

Language	Examples	Compare
English	Peter became/was offended.	Paul offended Peter.
French	Pierre s'est vexé.	Paul a vexé Pierre.
Spanish	Pedro se ofendió.	
Italian	Pietro si offese.	
Catalan	En Pere es va ofendre.	
Galician	Pedro ofendeuse.	
Romanian	Petre s-a supărat.	
Serbo-Croatian	Petar se uvrijedio.	
Slovene	Peter se je užalil.	
Bulgarian	Петър се обиди. Petăr se obidi.	
Polish	Piotr się obraził.	
Russian	Пётр обиделся. Pjotr obidelsja.	
German	Peter ärgerte sich.	
Lithuanian	Petras įsižeidė.	

=== Anticausative ===
"Anticausative" reflexive denotes that the (usually inanimate) subject of the verb undergoes an action or change of state whose agent is unclear or nonexistent.

Language	Examples	Compare
English	The door opened.	Paul opened the door.
French	La porte s'est ouverte.	Paul a ouvert la porte.
Spanish	La puerta se abrió.	
Portuguese	A porta abriu-se.	
Italian	La porta si aprì.	
Catalan	La porta es va obrir.	
Galician	A porta abriuse.	
Romanian	Ușa s-a deschis.	
Serbo-Croatian	Vrata su se otvorila.	
Slovene	Vrata so se odprla.	
Bulgarian	Вратата се отвори. Vratata se otvori.	
Polish	Drzwi się otworzyły.	
Russian	Дверь открылась. Dver' otkrylas'.	
German	Die Tür öffnete sich.	
Lithuanian	Durys atsidarė.	

=== Intransitive or impersonal ===
"Intransitive" forms (also known as "impersonal reflexive" or "mediopassive") are obtained by attaching the reflexive pronoun to intransitive verbs. The grammatical subject is either omitted (in pro-drop languages) or is a dummy pronoun (otherwise). Thus, those verbs are defective, as they have only the 3rd person singular (masculine or neuter, depending on language) form.

In Slavic languages, practically "the only condition is that they can be construed as having a human agent. The applied human agent can be generic, or loosely specified collective or individual."

Language	Examples	
Spanish	Aquí se trabaja bien.	Se dice que...
Portuguese	Aqui trabalha-se bem.	Diz-se que...
Italian	Qui si lavora bene.	Si dice che...
French	Ça se vend bien.	Il se murmure que...
Catalan	Aquí es treballa bé.	Hom/Es diu que...
Galician	Aquí trabállase ben.	Dise que...
Romanian	Aici se muncește bine.	Se zice că...
Serbo-Croatian	Tu se radi dobro.	Smatra se da...
Slovene	Tu se dobro dela.	Razume se, da...
Bulgarian	Тук се работи добре. Tuk se raboti dobre.	Смята се, че... Smyata se, če...
Polish	Tu pracuje się dobrze.	Uważa się, że...
Russian	Здесь хорошо работается. Zdes' khorosho rabotajetsja.	Думается, что... Dumajetsja, chto...
Lithuanian	Žmonės čia gerai darbuojasi.	Manoma, kad...
Lithuanian	Čia gerai darbuojamasi.	Manoma, kad...
German	Es arbeitet sich hier gut.	Man sagt sich, dass...
English	[People] work well here.	It is considered that...

In many cases, there is a semantic overlap between impersonal/anticausative/autocausative constructs and the passive voice (also present in all Romance and Slavic languages). On one hand, impersonal reflexive constructs have a wider scope of application, as they are not limited to transitive verbs like the canonical passive voice. On the other hand, those constructs can have slight semantic difference or markedness.

=== Inherent ===
"Inherent" or "pronominal" (inherently or essentially) reflexive verbs lack the corresponding non-reflexive from which they can be synchronically derived. In other words, the reflexive pronoun "is an inherent part of an unergative reflexive or reciprocal verb with no meaning of its own, and an obligatory part of the verb's lexical entry":

Language	Examples			
Spanish	Pedro se arrepintió.	Pedro se ríe (Note: The verb is reflexive, but not inherently. Both have non-reflexive forms: the transitive separar and the intransitive reír. In Lithuanian išsiskirti and skųstis have non-reflexive forms: transitive išskirti and transitive skųsti.)	María y Pedro se separaron.	Pedro se queja.
French	Pierre s'est repenti.	Pierre se marre. (informal)	Marie et Pierre se sont séparés.	Pierre se lamente.
Italian	Pietro si pentì.	(Note: The corresponding verb is not reflexive.)	Maria e Pietro si separarono.	Pietro si lamenta. (Note: Only the Spanish quejarse exists only in reflexive form (cf. the Latin deponent verb queror, I complain); however, in other languages, the corresponding non-reflexive verb has a different meaning, like "lament" or "mourn".)
Catalan	En Pere es va penedir.		La Maria i en Pere es van separar.	En Pere es lamenta.
Galician	Pedro arrepentiuse.			Pedro laméntase.
Serbo-Croatian	Petar se pokajao.	Petar se smije.	Marija i Petar su se rastali.	Petar se žali.
Slovene	Peter se kesa.	Peter se smeji.	Marija in Petar sta se razšla.	Peter se pritožuje.
Bulgarian	Петър се разкая. Petăr se razkaya.	Петър се смее. Petăr se smee.	Мария и Петър се разделиха. Mariya i Petăr se razdeliha.	Петър се жалва. Petăr se žalva.
Polish	Piotr się pokajał.	Piotr się śmieje.	Maria i Piotr się rozstali.	Piotr żali się.
Russian	Пётр раскаялся. Pjotr raskajalsja.	Пётр смеётся. Pjotr smejotsja.	Мария и Пётр расстались. Marija i Pjotr rasstalis'.	Пётр жалуется. Pjotr zhalujetsja.
Lithuanian	Petras atsiprašė.	Petras juokiasi.	Marija ir Petras išsiskyrė.	Petras skundžiasi.
English	Peter repented.	Peter laughs.	Mary and Peter parted.	Peter complains.

== Hebrew ==
In Hebrew, reflexive verbs are in binyan הִתְפַּעֵל. A clause whose predicate is a reflexive verb may never have an object but may have other modifiers. e.g.

- האיש התפטר מעבודתו - the man resigned from his job.
- האיש התמכר לסמים - the man got addicted to drugs.
- האיש התקלח בבוקר - the man 'showered himself', i.e., took/had a shower in the morning.
- האישה הסתפרה אצל אבי - the woman got a haircut/had her hair done at Avi's.

== Inuktitut ==
A reflexive verb is a verb which must have both an object and a subject, but where, in some context, both the object and the subject are identical. In Inuktitut, this situation is expressed by using a specific verb but by affixing a non-specific ending to it.

Specific

ᓇᓄᖅ ᖁᑭᖅᑕᕋ
Nanuq qukiqtara
I just shot the polar bear

Non-specific

ᓇᓄᕐᒥᒃ ᖁᑭᖅᓯᔪᖓ
Nanurmik qukiqsijunga
I just shot a polar bear

Reflexive

ᖁᑭᖅᑐᖓ
Qukiqtunga
I just shot myself

== Australian languages ==
=== Guugu Yimithirr ===
In Guugu Yimithirr (a member of the Pama-Nyungan language family) reflexivity can combine with past (PST), nonpast (NPST), and imperative (IMP) tense marking to form the verbal suffixes: /-dhi/ (REFL+PST), /-yi/ (REFL+NPST) and /-ya/ (REFL+IMP) respectively. See the following example where the verb waarmbal, a transitive verb meaning 'send back' is detransitivized to mean 'return' taking only one nominal argument with an agentive role:

Nyundu wanhdha=wanhdhaalga waarmba-aya?
2sg+NOM when return.REFL+NPST
When will you return?

The same valence-reduction process occurs for the transitive wagil 'cut'

Gaari wagi-iyi
NEG cut-REFL+IMP
Don't cut yourself!

In each of these cases, the reflexively inflected verb now forms a new stem to which additional morphology may be affixed, for example waarmba-adhi 'returned' may become waarmba-adhi-lmugu (return-REFL+PST-NEG) 'didn't return.' As with many Pama–Nyungan languages, however, verbs in the lexicon belong to conjugation classes, and a verbs class may restrict the ease with which it can be reflexivized.

These reflexive morphemes are largely employed for expressing reciprocality as well; however, in cases where there is potential ambiguity between a reflexive and a reciprocal interpretation, Guugu Yimithirr has an additional means for emphasizing the reflexive (i.e., by the agent upon the agent) interpretation: namely, the /-gu/ suffix upon the grammatical subject. See for example the following contrast between the reciprocal and reflexive:

==== Reciprocal ====
Bula gunda-adhi
3DU hit-REFL+PST
The two of them hit each other.

==== Reflexive ====
Bula-agu gunda-adhi
3DU-REFL hit-REFL+PST
The two of them hit themselves.

=== Gumbaynggir ===
Another Pama–Nyungan language, Gumbaynggir has a verbal suffix /-iri/ to mark reciprocality and de-transitivize transitive verbs e.g.

yaraŋ bulari bum-iri
DEM two-S hit-RECP+PST
Those two were fighting

=== Kuuk Thaayorre ===
As with Guugu Yimithirr, Kuuk Thaayorre, a Paman language, has some ambiguity between reflexive and reciprocal morphemes and constructions. Ostensibly, there are two suffixes /-e/ and /-rr/ for reflexivity and reciprocality respectively; however, in practice it is less clear cut. Take for example the presence of the reciprocal suffix in what should seem like a simple reflexive example.

pam thono tup ko’o-rr-r nhanganul watp
man one.NOM [ideophone] spear-RECP-PST.PFV 3SG.REFL dead
One man speared himself dead, whack!

Or the reverse wherein an apparent reciprocal assertion has reflexive morphology:

pul runc-e-r
2DU-NOM/ERG collide-REFL-NOM.PFV
They two collided with one other.

In actuality, the broader function of the reciprocal verb is to emphasize the agentivity of the grammatical subject(s), sometimes to directly counteract expectations of an external agent--as in the first example above. The combination of the reciprocal verb with the reflexive pronoun highlights the notion that the subject acted highly agentively (as in a mutual/symmetric reciprocal event) but was also the undergoer of their own action (as in a reflexive event where agentivity is backgrounded e.g. "I soiled myself").

Conversely, the reflexive verb can have precisely this function of backgrounding the agentivity of the subject and bringing the focus to the effect that was wrought upon the undergoer(s) as in the second example above.

== Uralic languages ==
=== Hungarian language ===
"The door opened" is expressed in Hungarian as "Az ajtó kinyílt", from the verb kinyílik, while the passive voice is rare and archaic. There are numerous verb pairs where one element is active and the other expresses middle voice, something happening apparently on its own, rendered in English like "to become, get, grow, turn" (something). See also the grammatical voice of Hungarian verbs and the Wiktionary entries of -ul/-ül, -ódik/-ődik and -odik/-edik/-ödik, three suffix groups that form such verbs.

== See also ==
- Deponent verb
- Passive voice
- Reciprocal (grammar)
- Reciprocal pronoun
- Reflexive pronoun
