= Burzio's generalization =

Concept in linguistics

In generative linguistics, Burzio's generalization is the observation that a verb can assign a theta role (a title used to describe the relationship between the noun phrase and the predicate, such as agent, theme, and goal) to its subject position if and only if it can assign an accusative case to its object. Accordingly, if a verb does not assign a theta role to its subject, then it does not assign accusative case to its object.

Although the generalization is named after Italian linguist Luigi Burzio, based on work published in the 1980s, the seeds of the idea are found in earlier scholarship. The generalization can be logically written in the following equation:

                   	                    	θ ↔ A
         Where:  θ = Subject theta role
                 A = Accusative case

Burzio's generalization recognizes two classes of intransitive verbs:

1. With unaccusative intransitive verbs (e.g., fall), the single argument bears the theme theta role, and the subject is understood as the undergoer or receiver of the action. For example, in the sentence Emily fell, the subject Emily undergoes the action of falling.
2. With unergative intransitive verbs (e.g., laugh), the single argument bears the agent theta role and is understood as the doer of the action. For example, in the sentence Emily laughed, the subject Emily performs the action of laughing.

Burzio's generalization establishes a parallel between unaccusative verbs (which Burzio referred to as ergative verbs) and passives, neither of which assign a subject theta role or accusative case.

He describes the intransitive occurrence of ergative verbs in the generalization that bears his name:

       "All and only the verbs that can assign a theta-role to the subject can assign Accusative Case to an object."[3]

== Classes of intransitive verbs ==
=== Intransitives ===
Burzio's observations led to his creation of two separate classes of intransitive verbs. In the first, Burzio claimed that intransitives are not homogenous and exemplified this observation with the following examples from Italian:

Giovanni arriv-a
Giovanni arrive-3SG.PRS.
"Giovanni arrives" (Burzio 1986: 20 (1a))

Giovanni telefon-a
Giovanni telephone-3SG.PRS.
"Giovanni telephones" (Burzio 1986: 20 (1b))

Both the verbs in 1a and 1b are classified as intransitives; they take only one argument. However, what led Burzio to claim that the class of intransitives should be further divided was the distribution of the clitic ne (of-them).

Ne arriv-ano molt-i
{of them} arrive-3PL.PRS. many-M.PL.
"Many of them arrive" (Burzio 1986: 20 (2a))

*Ne telefon-ano molt-i
{}{of them} telephone-3PL.PRS. many-M.PL.
"Many of them telephone"(Burzio 1986: 20 (2b))

The different behavior of these two intransitive verbs led to the hypothesis that the class of verbs known as intransitives were divided. Burzio argued that due to the grammatical differences between 2a and 2b, the underlying structures of 1a and 1b must be different.

In Italian, it is assumed that there is free subject inversion, which means that if a subject appears pre-verb, it will have a post-verb counterpart. The example below demonstrates this assumption:

Molt-i espert-i arriver-anno
Many-M.PL expert-M.PL arrive-3PL.FUT
"Many experts will arrive"

Arriver-anno molt-i espert-i
Arrive-3PL.FUT many-M.PL expert-M.PL
"Many experts will arrive"

Burzio classified the subjects such as in 3b as i-subjects (inverted subjects). It turns out that ne-cliticization (Ne-Cl) is possible only with a direct object, but on further observation, Ne-Cl is also possible with i-subjects that are related to a direct object, as is the case with inherently passive verbs. A distributional test for unaccusativity is whether or not it can take a Ne-Cl (see the Distributional tests section below).

The distribution of ne and auxiliary essere motivated the existence of a class of intransitive verbs called labile verbs. This class of verbs, also known as alternating unaccusatives or alternating ambitransitives, can undergo causative alteration to be used in a transitive form; however, the subject of the intransitive form will become the direct object in the transitive sentence, taking on the theme theta role in both. When these alternating verbs are used transitively, they are referred to as causatives because the subject takes the agent role; and when they are used intransitively, they are referred to as anticausatives because the subject takes the theme role.

The following flow chart depicts the difference between the two types of intransitive verbs; unaccusative and unergative. Unaccusative verbs are subdivided into pure unaccusatives and alternating unaccusatives (unaccusatives that are able to undergo causative alternation, such as labile verbs). For more information on alternating unaccusatives, see causative alternation.

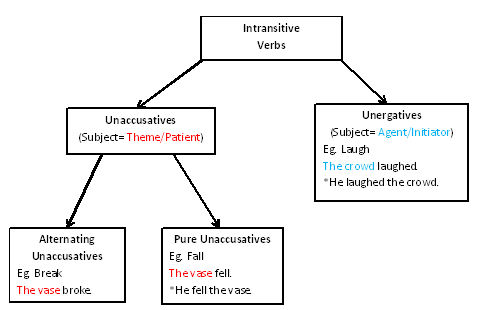
Subcategories of intransitive verbs. Adapted from Florian Schäfer (2009).

=== Motivation for Burzio's generalization ===
Burzio's generalization stems from two important observations:

1. Why, if verbs should assign accusative case to their objects, does the determiner phrase (DP) that is the complement to an unaccusative verb not receive it.
2. Unaccusative verbs lack an (agent) theta role.

== Assignment of theta role and case ==
=== Theta role assignment ===
Theta roles (or thematic roles) are bundles of thematic relations. Certain theta roles are more commonly assigned to the subject, such as agent; other theta roles are more common to the object, such as patient or theme. Subjects of unaccusative verbs bear a theta role that is common to objects, which leads to the hypothesis that in the D-structure, the determiner phrase subject occupies the object position in the syntactic tree. The following is a theta grid for the ergative verb fall, which has the argument structure V[DP___]:

Fall

Agent

  DP

The theta criterion ensures there is a one-to-one mapping of theta roles to arguments by stating the following:

1. Each argument is assigned one and only one theta role, and
2. Each theta role must be assigned to an argument.

This is important in the context of Burzio's generalization because it requires that all arguments must take a theta role and all theta roles must be assigned. This means that if a verb has a theta role to assign, it must assign it.

=== Theta role assignment hypothesis developments ===
In the 1980s, when Burzio was formulating this generalization, it was understood that the verb assigned the theta role to the subject. Since then, however, in light of new data such as idiom formation, it is now hypothesized that voice phrase assigns the theta role to the subject and not the verb. In this article, it has been adopted that the verb assigns the theta role as it was when Burzio was formulating his generalization.

=== Assigning case ===
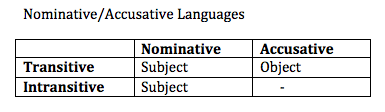
Adapted from Carnie (2013).

Burzio's generalization is observable in English, German, and many Romance languages due to a common case system (nominative/accusative). In nominative/accusative languages, the subject of both a transitive verb and an intransitive verb are assigned nominative case, and only the object DP of a transitive verb receives accusative case.

Case assignment is associated with local dependency and feature checking of a DP. All DP's must check for case if, and only if, they are in the specifier or complement position of the case assigner. The finite T assigns the nominative case to a subject DP in its specifier position. The verb (V) assigns the accusative case to a DP in the complement position. A preposition can also assign case (prepositional case) to a DP in the complement position.

     α assigns case to β if and only if:

     α is a verb or preposition
     β is a specifier/complement to α [15]

In the Italian language, identifying accusative case has two requirements; the occurrence of third person accusatives like lo, la and accusative forms of me, te for the first and second person pronouns, differing from their nominative equivalents io and tu. He also states that ergative verbs do not have accusative case and therefore do not assign accusative case to the object. Below, the non-argument subject does not succeed at being correlated to a verbal argument.

* Gli cad-e me addosso
{} {to him} fall-3SG.PRS me upon
"It falls on him"

* Gliele scapp-ava
{} to-him-them escape-3SG.IMPERF
"It escaped them from him"

* Arriv-a te
{} arrive-3SG.PRS. you
"It arrives you"

== Parallel between passives and unaccusative verbs ==
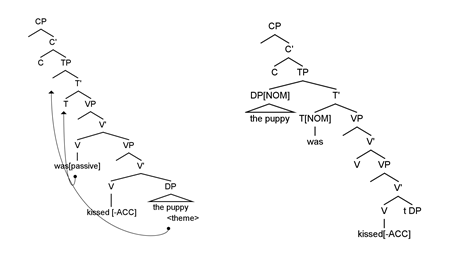
Theta role and case assignment in a passive D-structure (left) and S-structure (right) Adapted from Carnie (2013).

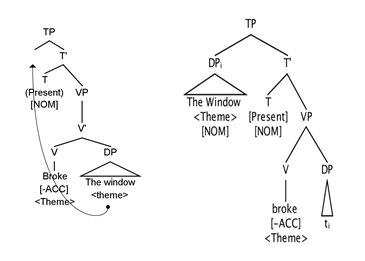
Theta role and case assignment in an unaccusative D-structure (left) and S-structure (right). Adapted from Shafer (2009).

Burzio's generalization builds off the cross-linguistic similarities observed in passives and unaccusatives, where a verb fails to assign a theta role to the subject and cannot assign accusative case to the object. These structures all undergo similar DP movement as a way to satisfy the extended projection principle and case theory. The extended projection principle states that all clauses must contain a DP subject. Case theory states that all DP's must check for case in the complement or specifier position. A theta role is not assigned to the subject position because the subject is underlyingly in the object position during theta role assignment (which happens in the D-structure). Therefore, it has a theta role that is typically given to objects, such as theme. Verbs in these structures cannot assign accusative case, therefore the DP must move to the empty specifier position of finite tense (T) in order to fulfill the subject position and check for case. Once the DP has moved to the specifier position of tense phrase (TP), nominative case is assigned to the DP by the T position. This occurs in the S-structure after the DP has moved from the object position.

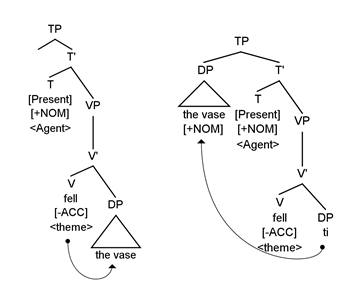
Theta role and case assignment in a present D-structure (left) and S-structure (right).

It should not be assumed that labile verbs do not inherently have either accusative case or a subject theta role to assign. This is exemplified in the transitive counterparts of alternating unaccusatives. The labile verb can act as a transitive and assigns both an agent theta role to the subject and accusative case to the object (see causative alternation) in an example such as "John broke the vase." Burzio's generalization refers only to intransitive ergative verbs such as fall that cannot take a direct object like unergatives and alternating unaccusatives. For example, "The vase fell" cannot take a direct object ("The vase fell the table.")

The generalization now becomes quite clear. In ergative verbs, if the verb does not assign a theta role to its subject (because in the D-structure this position is empty) then it also does not assign accusative case to its object (because this position is empty in the S-structure due to DP movement). This is observable only in ergative intransitive verbs.

== Distributional tests ==
There are two distributional tests that are used to determine if a verb is ergative: there-inversion and ne-cliticization. In each corresponding test, there or ne is inserted before the verb and the sentence is tested for grammaticality. Based on the grammaticality of the sentence the class of verb can be determined.

=== There-inversion ===
There-inversion is a distributional test introducing a different word order by inserting there before the verb. This insertion forces the object to remain underlyingly in the object position. Unaccusative verbs such as arrive will allow this alternative word order, whereas unergative verbs such as dance will not. An unergative verb will appear to be ungrammatical because the subject is not generated in the object position. The example below is adapted from Andrew Carnie (2013).

   1a) *There danced three men at the palace.
   1b) ?There arrived three men at the palace.

=== Ne-cliticization ===
In Italian, ne-cliticization is a test to check if a verb is ergative. The example below is adapted from Liliane Haegeman (1985).

Giovanni ne ha insultat-i due
Giovanni {of them} have-3SG.PST. insult-M.PL.PST.PTCP. two
"Giovanni has insulted two of them"

* Giovanni ne ha parl-ato a due
{} Giovanni {of them} have-3SG.PST. speak-M.SG.PST.PTCP. to two
"Giovanni has spoken to two of them"

In (1a)due is in the object position and therefore it is possible to have the partitive ne. In (1b) due is the complement to the preposition which results in the partitive ne making the sentence ungrammatical.

Ne furono arrest-ati molt-i
{of them} be-3PL.REMPST. arrest-M.PL.PST.PTCP. many-M.PL.
"Many of them were arrested"

In (2) there is a passive sentences with inverted post-verbal subjects. Ne-cliticization is possible if it is assumed that post-verbal subjects are in the object position.

Ne arriv-ano molt-i
{of them} arrive-3PL.PRS. many-M.PL.
"Many of them arrive"

Ergatives are structurally the same as passives, which leads to the expectation that ne-cliticization is possible.

== Contrasts to Burzio's generalization ==
Contrasts to Burzio's generalization include ergative–absolutive languages; dative case marking; and English existential, raising, and weather verbs. These construction types are similar in that they all violate the bidirectional relationship in Burzio's generalization that exists between the subject theta role and assignment of the accusative case to the object.

=== Ergative absolute languages ===
Adapted from Carnie (2013).

The case system in ergative-absolutive languages differs from the Romance languages on which Burzio's generalization is based. In ergative/absolute system, the same case (absolutive) is assigned to the object of transitive verbs and subject of intransitive verbs. Ergative case is assigned to the subjects of transitive verbs. Most languages do not strictly follow either Nom/Acc or Erg/Abs case systems but often use a combination of both systems in different circumstances. Subject construction types (including passive and ergative constructions), in languages such as Hindi, have verbs that do not assign accusative case to the object yet still acquire theta roles in the subject position. The inability of the verb to assign case is evident by the object that undergoes movement to a higher clause to check for case, which is reflected in the agreement with auxiliaries.

The following example is an ergative subject construction that assigns a theta role to the subject position yet fails to assign case to the object.

Siitaa ne vah ghar khariidaa (thaa)
Sita-F-ERG that house-M buy-PERF-M be-PRS-M {}
"Sita had bought that house"

=== Dative case marking ===
Icelandic is an example of a language that uses lexical categories to determine nominal morphology. Particular verbs known as quirky case require a certain case only on the nominals that have been assigned theta role and will obscure the underlying morphology. These verbs create unpredictable patterns of dative morphology assignment.

Below are two examples from Esther Torrego (2011) that show data case is assigned by a quirky case verb, finish. In example 1, the assignment of dative case is unpredictable by the verb because normally it would be expected that the object would take the accusative case. In example 2, the subject takes the dative case although normally the nominative case would be expected.

Þeir luku kirkjunni
they finished the-church.DAT

Kirkjunni var lokið (af Jóni)
the-church.DAT was finished {} {}

These examples show that the assignment of accusative and nominative is undetectable, morphologically speaking.

=== Verbs that fail to assign an external theta role ===
Verbs with dethematized subject positions, subjects without theta-roles, cannot be embedded by a control predicate in languages such as English, where pronouns cannot be dropped. Prominent examples are existential, raising, and weather verbs, which cannot assign theta roles to their subject positions but still assign case to their objects, conflicting with Burzio's generalization. This is because, for example, weather verbs can take the cognate objects. Unergative verbs can assign case to its following position, whereas unaccusative ones cannot.

The sentences below exemplify how weather verbs, intransitive unaccusative verbs with cognate objects, can assign case to their object positions.

  1)It snowed an artificial kind of snow.
  2)It rained acid rain.

== Alternative analyses ==
=== Ergative generalization ===
Construction types that violate the bidirectional relationship in Burzio's generalization (see the Hindi example above) provide evidence that a similar generalization can be made for such languages: the absence of a subject theta role implies that ergative case is unassigned. This is sometimes referred to as the ergative generalization or as Marantz's generalization after linguist Alec Marantz, who first proposed it. His generalization states that even when the ergative case may go on the subject of an intransitive clause, ergative case will not appear on a derived subject. Marantz suggests that this inconsistency in Burzio's generalization is accounted for by independent factors such as universal grammar and language-specific construction types. Several attempts have been made to unify this generalization with Burzio's in a larger framework.

=== Optimality theory ===
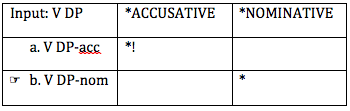
Unaccusative verbs. Adapted from Legendre et al. (2001).

Burzio's generalization can be enforced with ranked and inviolable interacting constraints based on Optimality Theory. Markedness and faithfulness constraints are ranked to select an optimal candidate. In an Optimality Theory (OT) style of analysis, the argument of an ergative intransitive verb can potentially be assigned to either the nominative case (NOM) or accusative case (ACC).

A markedness constraint, which ranks ACC above NOM, prevents ACC from surfacing on the subject. A faithfulness constraint, which prohibits an argument from bearing multiple cases, prevents NOM and ACC from being assigned to the same argument. Case on the argument is ranked highly on the tableau. In addition, a faithfulness constraint (FAITHLEX, which requires that the inherent case-licensing must be checked) must be ranked highly in the tableau. Constraint definitions: *ACCUSATIVE: assign a violation mark to an unaccusative verb with the accusative case. *NOMINATIVE: assign a violation mark to an unaccusative verb with the nominative case.

=== Nominalization ===
Burzio believes that case absorption of object case removes an agent project from the subject position, which can apply from within the VP to the specifier of AP(-able) to the specifier of NP(-ity) to the specifier of the DP. It has been argued that lexical rules obey syntactic constraints and that feature-movement occurs within the lexicon.

== Abbreviations ==
3- Third person
ERG-Ergative
F- Female
FUT- Future
IMPERF- imperfect
M- Masculine
PERF - Perfect
PST- Past
PTCP- Participle
PRS- present
PL- Plural
SG- Singular
REMPST- Remote ast
