= Theta role =

Phrase in linguistics

Theta roles are the names of the participant roles associated with a predicate: the predicate may be a verb, an adjective, a preposition, or a noun. If an object is in motion or in a steady state as the speakers perceive the state, or it is the topic of discussion, it is called a theme. The participant is usually said to be an argument of the predicate. In generative grammar, a theta role or θ-role is the formal device for representing syntactic argument structure—the number and type of noun phrases—required syntactically by a particular verb. For example, the verb put requires three arguments (i.e., it is trivalent).

The formal mechanism for implementing a verb's argument structure is codified as theta roles. The verb put is said to "assign" three theta roles. This is coded in a theta grid associated with the lexical entry for the verb. The correspondence between the theta grid and the actual sentence is accomplished by means of a bijective filter on the grammar known as the theta criterion. Early conceptions of theta roles include Fillmore (1968) (Fillmore called theta roles "cases") and Gruber (1965).

Theta roles are prominent in government and binding theory and the standard theory of transformational grammar.

== Thematic relations ==
The term "theta role" is often used interchangeably with the term thematic relations (particularly in mainstream generative grammar—for an exception see Carnie 2006). The reason for this is simple: theta roles typically reference thematic relations. In particular, theta roles are often referred to by the most prominent thematic relation in them. For example, a common theta role is the primary or external argument. Typically, this theta role maps to a noun phrase (NP) which bears an agent thematic relation. As such, the theta role is called the "agent" theta role. This often leads to confusion between the two notions. The two concepts, however, can be distinguished in a number of ways.

- Thematic relations express the semantic relations that the entities denoted by the noun phrases bear towards the action or state denoted by the verb. By contrast, theta roles are syntactic notions about the number, type and placement of obligatory arguments. For instance, in the sentence Fergus ate the kibble, the fact that
  - there are two arguments (Fergus and the kibble), and
  - Fergus must be capable of volition and of doing the action, and
  - the kibble must be something that can be eaten

is a fact about theta roles (the number and types of the arguments). The actual semantic type of the argument is described by the thematic relation.

- Not all theoretical approaches use theta roles. Theta roles are largely limited to the Chomskyan (Noam Chomsky) versions of generative grammar and lexical functional grammar. Many other approaches, such as functional grammar and dependency grammar, refer to thematic relations directly without an intermediate step in theta roles.
- Only arguments of the verb bear theta roles; optional adjunct modifiers—even if they are prepositional phrases (PPs) such as on Friday or noun phrases (NPs) like yesterday—don't take theta roles. But almost all NPs (except expletives) express thematic relations. A PP can bear a theta role in the case of ditransitive verbs, where it may take a goal argument such as with the English verb give (see theta grid under Theta grids and the theta criterion).
- An argument can bear only one theta role, but can take multiple thematic relations. For example, in Susan gave Bill the paper, Susan bears both Agent and Source thematic relations, but it only bears one theta role (the external "agent" role).
- Thematic relations are properties of nouns and noun phrases. Theta roles can be assigned to any argument including noun phrases, prepositional phrases and embedded clauses. Thematic relations are not assigned to embedded clauses, and prepositions typically mark the thematic relation on an NP.

One common way of thinking about theta roles is that they are bundles of thematic relations associated with a particular argument position (Carnie 2006).

== Theta grids and the theta criterion ==
Theta roles are stored in a verb's theta grid. Grids typically come in two forms. The simplest and easiest to type is written as an ordered list between angle brackets. The argument associated with the external argument position (which typically ends up being the subject in active sentences) is written first and underlined. The theta roles are named by the most prominent thematic relation that they contain. In this notation, the theta grid for a verb such as give is <agent, theme, goal>.

The other notation (see for example the textbook examples in Haegeman 1994 and Carnie 2006) separates the theta roles into boxes, in which each column represents a theta role. The top row represents the names of the thematic relations contained in the theta role. In some work (e.g., Carnie 2006), this box also contains information about the lexical category associated with the theta role, such as a determiner phrase (DP) or adpositional phrase (PP). This mingles theta-theory with the notion of subcategorization. The bottom row gives a series of indexes which are associated with subscripted markers in the sentence itself which indicate that the NPs they are attached to have been assigned the theta role in question.

The theta grid for give
Agent source DP	theme DP	goal PP
i	j	k

When applied to the sentence [_{S}[_{NP} Susan]_{i} gave [_{NP} the food]_{j} [_{PP}to Biff]_{k}] the indices mark that Susan is assigned the external theta role of agent/source, the food is assigned the theme role, and to Biff is assigned the goal role.

The theta criterion (or θ-criterion) is the formal device in Government and Binding Theory for enforcing the one to one match between arguments and theta roles. This acts as a filter on the D-structure of the sentence. If an argument fails to have the correct match between the number of arguments (typically NPs, PPs, or embedded clauses) and the number of theta roles, the sentence will be ungrammatical or unparseable. Chomsky's formulation (Chomsky 1981, p. 36) is:

The theta criterion Each argument bears one and only one θ-role, and each θ-role is assigned to one and only one argument.

Although it is often not explicitly stated, adjuncts are excluded from the theta criterion.

== Thematic hierarchies ==
Drawing on observations based in typological cross-linguistic comparisons of languages (Fillmore 1968), linguists in the relational grammar (RG) tradition (e.g. Perlmutter & Postal 1984) observed that particular thematic relations and theta roles map on to particular positions in the sentence. For example, in unmarked situations agents map to subject positions, themes onto object position, and goals onto indirect objects. In RG, this is encoded in the Universal Alignment Hypothesis (or UAH), where the thematic relations are mapped directly into argument position based on the following hierarchy: Agent < Theme < Experiencer < Others. Mark Baker adopted this idea into GB theory in the form of the Uniformity of Theta Assignment Hypothesis (or UTAH) (Baker 1988). UTAH explains how identical thematic relationships between items are shown by identical structural relationships. A different approach to the correspondence is given in (Hale & Keyser 1993) and (Hale & Keyser 2001), where there are no such things as underlying theta roles or even thematic relations. Instead, the interpretive component of the grammar identifies the semantic role of an argument based on its position in the tree.

== Argument structure in other formal approaches ==
=== Lexical-functional grammar (LFG) ===
Lexical-functional grammar (LFG) (Falk 2001) and (Bresnan 2001) is perhaps the most similar to Chomskyan approaches in implementing theta-roles. However, LFG uses three distinct layers of structure for representing the relations or functions of arguments: θ-structure, a-structure (argument structure) and f-structure (functional structure) which expresses grammatical relations. These three layers are linked together using a set of intricate linking principles. Thematic relations in the θ-structure are mapped onto a set of positions in the a-structure which are tied to features [+o] (roughly "object") and [±r] (roughly "restricted" meaning it is marked explicitly by a preposition or a case marking). Themes map to [-r], second themes map to [+o] and non-themes map to [-o]. These features then determine how the arguments are mapped to specific grammatical functions in the sentence. The first [-o] argument is mapped to the SUBJ (subject) relation. If there is no [-o] argument then the first [-r] argument is mapped to the SUBJ relation. If neither of these apply, then you add the plus value ([+r] or [+o]) to the feature structure and apply the following mappings: [-o,-r]: SUBJ, [+o, -r]: Object (OBJ), [-o,+r]: prepositional marked oblique (OBL_{θ}), [+o, +r]: prepositionally marked object (OBJ_{θ}). These mappings are further constrained by the following constraints:

Function argument biuniqueness: Each a-structure role corresponds to a unique f-structure function, and each f-structure function corresponds to a unique a-structure role

The Subject Condition: Every verb must have a SUBJ

F-structures are further constrained by the following two constraints which do much of the same labor as the θ-criterion:

Coherence requires that every participant in the f-structure of a sentence must be mentioned in a-structure (or in a constituting equation) of a predicate in its clause.

Completeness: An f-structure for a sentence must contain values for all the grammatical functions mentioned in a-structure.

=== Head-driven phrase structure grammar (HPSG) ===
Head-driven phrase structure grammar (HPSG) (for a textbook introduction, see Sag, Wasow & Bender 2005) does not use theta roles per se, but divides their property into two distinct feature structures. The number and category are indicated by a feature called ARG-STR. This feature is an ordered list of categories that must cooccur with a particular verb or predicate. For example, the ARG-STR list of the verb give is <NP, NP, PP>. The semantic part of theta roles (i.e. the thematic relations) are treated in a special set of semantic restriction (RESTR) features. These typically express the semantic properties more directly than thematic relations. For example, the semantic relations associated with the arguments of the verb give are not agent, theme and goal, but giver, given, givee.

=== Approaches that eschew theta roles ===
Many approaches to grammar including construction grammar and the Simpler Syntax model (Culicover & Jackendoff 2005) (see also Jackendoff's earlier work on argument structure and semantics, including Jackendoff 1983 and Jackendoff 1990) claim that theta roles (and thematic relations) are neither a good way to represent the syntactic argument structure of predicates nor of the semantic properties that they reveal. They argue for more complex and articulated semantic structures (often called Lexical-conceptual structures) which map onto the syntactic structure.

Similarly, most typological approaches to grammar, functionalist theories (such as functional grammar and Role and Reference Grammar (Van Valin & LaPolla 1997)), and dependency grammar do not use theta roles, but they may make reference to thematic relations and grammatical relations or their notational equivalents. These are usually related to one another directly using principles of mapping.

== See also ==
- Case grammar
- Morphosyntactic alignment
- Syntax–semantics interface
- Thematic relations
- Valency (linguistics)
- Subcategorization

== Sources ==
- Baker, Mark (1988), Incorporation: A Theory of Grammatical Function Changing, University of Chicago Press
- Bresnan, Joan (2001), Lexical Functional Syntax, Blackwell, ISBN 0-631-20973-5
- Carnie, Andrew (2006), Syntax: A Generative Introduction, Blackwell
- Chomsky, Noam (1981), Lectures on Government and Binding, Mouton
- Culicover, Peter; Jackendoff, Ray (2005), Simpler Syntax, Oxford University Press
- Dowty, David. 1979. Word meaning and Montague grammar. The semantics of verbs and times in Generative Semantics and in Montague's PTQ: Synthese Language Library. Dordrecht: Reidel.
- Falk, Yehuda N. (2001), Lexical-Functional Grammar: An Introduction to Parallel Constraint-Based Syntax, CSLI, ISBN 1-57586-341-3
- Fillmore, Charles J. (1968), "The Case for Case", in Bach, Emmon; Harms, Robert (eds.), Universals in Linguistic Theory, New York: Holt, Rinehart and Winston
- Fillmore, Charles J. (1971), "Types of lexical information", in Steinberg, D.; Jacobovitz, L. (eds.), Semantics: An interdisciplinary reader in philosophy, linguistics and psychology, Cambridge University Press
- Gruber, Jeffrey (1965), Studies in lexical relations, Massachusetts Institute of Technology
- Hale, Kenneth; Keyser, Samuel J. (1993), "On argument structure and the lexical expression of syntactic relations", in Hale, K.; S.J. Keyser (eds.), The view from Building 20: Essays in honor of Sylvain Bromberger, Cambridge: MIT Press
- Haegeman, L. (1994), Introduction to government and binding theory (2nd ed.), Oxford, UK: Blackwell
- Hale, K.; Keyser, S.J. (2001), Prolegomenon to a Theory of Argument Structure. Linguistic Inquiry Monograph 39, MIT Press
- Harley, Heidi. 2007. Thematic Roles. In Patrick Hogan, ed. The Cambridge Encyclopedia of the Language Sciences. Cambridge University Press.
- Jackendoff, Ray (1983), Semantics and cognition, Cambridge, Massachusetts: MIT Press
- Jackendoff, Ray (1990), Semantic structures, Cambridge, Massachusetts: MIT Press
- Perlmutter, David; Postal, Paul (1984), "The 1-advancement exclusiveness law", in David Perlmutter; Carol G. Rosen (eds.), Studies in Relational Grammar 2, University of Chicago Press, pp. 81–125
- Reinhart, Tanya (2002). The Theta System: An Overview. Theoretical Linguistics 28(3), 229-290, as well as comment articles in the same issue. A version of Reinhart's paper is accessible online
- Sag, Ivan; Wasow, Thomas; Bender (2005), An Introduction to Formal Syntax, CSLI Publications
- Tenny, Carol (1992) Lexical Matters: The Aspectual Interface Hypothesis. Center for the Study of Language and Information Leland Stanford Junior University.
- Van Valin, Robert; LaPolla, Randy (1997), Syntax: Structure meaning and function, Cambridge University Press
