= Case grammar =

System of linguistic analysis

Case grammar is a system of linguistic analysis, focusing on the link between the valence, or number of subjects, objects, etc., of a verb and the grammatical context it requires. The system was created by the American linguist Charles J. Fillmore in the context of Transformational Grammar (1968). This theory analyzes the surface syntactic structure of sentences by studying the combination of deep cases (i.e. semantic roles, such as Agent, Object, Benefactor, Location or Instrument etc.) which are required by a specific verb. For instance, the verb "give" in English requires an Agent (A) and Object (O), and a Beneficiary (B); e.g. "Jones (A) gave money (O) to the school (B).

According to Fillmore, each verb selects a certain number of deep cases which form its case frame. Thus, a case frame describes important aspects of semantic valency of verbs, adjectives and nouns. Case frames are subject to certain constraints, such as that a deep case can occur only once per sentence. Some of the cases are obligatory and others are optional. Obligatory cases may not be deleted, at the risk of producing ungrammatical sentences. For example, Mary gave the apples is ungrammatical in this sense.

A fundamental hypothesis of case grammar is that grammatical functions, such as subject or object, are determined by the deep, semantic valence of the verb, which finds its syntactic correlate in such grammatical categories as Subject and Object, and in grammatical cases such as Nominative and Accusative. Fillmore (1968) puts forwards the following hierarchy for a universal subject selection rule:

Agent < Instrumental < Objective

That means that if the case frame of a verb contains an agent, this one is realized as the subject of an active sentence; otherwise, the deep case following the agent in the hierarchy (i.e. Instrumental) is promoted to subject.

The influence of case grammar on contemporary linguistics has been significant, to the extent that numerous linguistic theories incorporate deep roles in one or other form, such as the so-called Thematic structure in Government and Binding theory. It has also inspired the development of frame-based representations in AI research.

During the 1970s and the 1980s, Charles Fillmore extended his original theory onto what was called Frame Semantics. Walter A. Cook, SJ, a linguistics professor at Georgetown University, was one of the foremost case grammar theoreticians following Fillmore's original work. Cook devoted most of his scholarly research from the early 1970s until the 1990s to further developing case grammar as a tool for linguistic analysis, language teaching methodology, and other applications, and was the author of several major texts and many articles in case grammar. Cook directed several doctoral dissertations (see e.g., Moskey 1978) applying case grammar to various areas of theoretical and applied linguistics research.

== See also ==
- Thematic role
- Theta role
- Kāraka, a concept in Pāṇini's grammar
