= Theta criterion =

The theta-criterion (also named θ-criterion) is a constraint on x-bar theory that was first proposed by Noam Chomsky (1981) as a rule within the system of principles of the government and binding theory, called theta-theory (θ-theory). As theta-theory is concerned with the distribution and assignment of theta-roles (a.k.a. thematic roles), the theta-criterion describes the specific match between arguments and theta-roles (θ-roles) in logical form (LF):

θ-criterion: Each argument bears one and only one θ-role, and each θ-role is assigned to one and only one argument.

— (Chomsky 1981, p. 35)

Being a constraint on x-bar theory, the criterion aims to filter out ill-formed sentences. Thus, if the number or categories of arguments in a sentence do not meet the theta-role assigner's requirements in any given sentence, that sentence will be deemed ungrammatical. (Carnie 2007, p. 224). In other words, theta-criterion sorts sentences into grammatical and ungrammatical bins based on c-selection and s-selection.

== Applied ==
=== Theta grid ===
A theta-role is a status of thematic relation (Chomsky 1981, p. 35). In other words, a theta-role describes the connection of meaning between a predicate or a verb and a constituent selected by this predicate. The number, types and positions of theta-roles that a lexicon assigns is encoded in its lexical entry (Chomsky 1981, p. 38) and must be satisfied in syntactic structure following Projection Principle. (Note: Note that this doesn't mean that all theta-roles are obligatorily assigned. If a structural position that can be theta-marked is obligatory, then the theta-role assignment is also obligatory. Otherwise it is not (Chomsky 1981, p. 40). See Transitivity section) The selection of a constituent by a head based on meaning is called s-selection (semantic-selection) and those based on grammatical categories are called c-selection. (Note: Such selection (theta-role assignment) is strictly local and only occurs between sister nodes. A lexical head assigns a theta-role to its complement, and the subject of this XP can receive a theta-role from the X' including the head and its complement. The argument in subject position is called external argument, and the one in object position is called internal argument.(Williams 1981) Adjuncts don't receive theta-roles so are not restricted by theta-criterion.) (Sportiche, Koopman & Stabler 2014, p. 141) Such information can be expressed with a theta grid.

In the example below the verb 'love' has two theta-roles to assign: agent (the entity who loves) and theme (the entity being loved). In accordance with the theta-criterion, each theta-role must have its argument counterpart.

Theta-roles	AGENT		THEME
	|		|
(1a)	Megan	loves	Kevin
(Carnie 2007, p. 225 (22))

In Example 1a, Megan and Kevin are the arguments that the verb assigns the agent and theme theta-roles to, respectively. Because there is a one-to-one mapping of argument to theta-role, the theta-criterion is satisfied and the sentence is deemed grammatical (Carnie 2007, p. 225). Below are two examples where the theta-criterion has not been fulfilled and are thus ungrammatical.

Theta-roles	AGENT		THEME
	|		|
(1b)	*Megan	loves	
(Carnie 2007, p. 225 (24))

Theta-roles	AGENT		THEME	
	|		|	|
(1c)	*Megan	loves	Jason	Kevin
(Carnie 2007, p. 226 (26))

Example 1b is ungrammatical (marked with *) because there are more theta-roles available than there are arguments. The theta-role theme does not have an argument matched to it. On the other hand, in example (1c), there are more arguments than theta-roles. Both theta-roles are matched to arguments (Megan with Agent and Jason with theme), but there is an argument left without a corresponding theta-role (Kevin has no theta-role) (Carnie 2007). Thus for reasons of inequality in number between theta-roles and arguments, with either having more than the other, the result will be ungrammatical.

=== Consequence on movement ===
Since trace transmits theta-role, movements resulting in non-local relations between theta-role assigners and receivers in surface structure don't violate theta-criterion. This allows us to generate sentences with DP-raising, head movement, wh-movement, etc. However, if a phrase occupies a theta-position (complement or selected subject) in D-structure, it can no longer move to another theta-position or it will receive two theta-roles (Chomsky 1981, p. 46).

== Special cases ==
=== Transitivity ===
Verbs that can be either transitive or intransitive at the first glance could present a problem for the theta-criterion. For a transitive verb, such as "hit," we assign the theta-roles agent and theme to the arguments, as shown in (2b), (2c), and (2d):

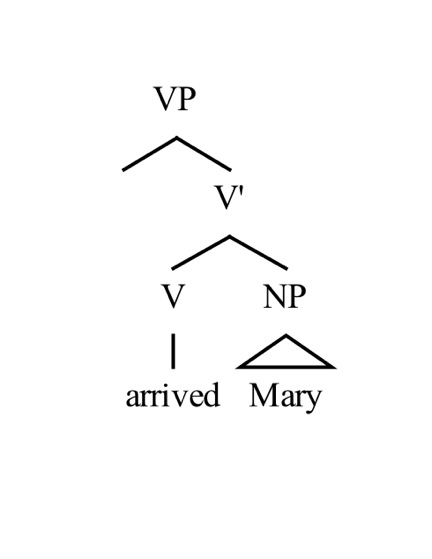
(3c). The underlying representation of "Mary arrived." by a syntactic tree.

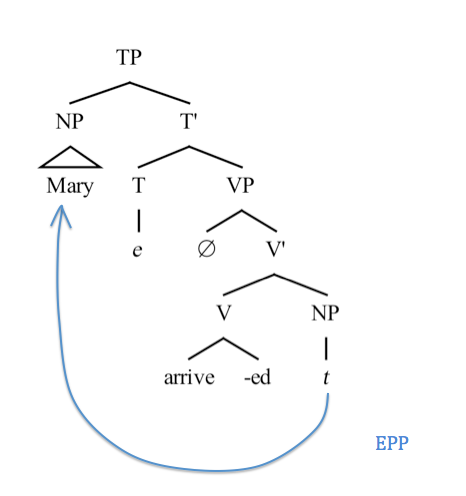
(3d). The surface representation of "Mary arrived." by a syntactic tree. "Mary" is projected to the spec-TP position by the extended projection principle triggered by the [+tense] tense morpheme.

Theta-roles	<AGENT>		<THEME>	
	|		|	
(2a)	*John	hit.		
(2b)	John	hit	his sister	
(2c)	John	hit	the beach	early.
(2d)	John	hit	middle-age	
(adapted from (Rice 1988, p. 207))

The action of hitting here requires an animate subject, an agent, carry out the action. The theme is then someone or something that undergoes the action. For an intransitive verb, such as "arrive," we assign the theta-role theme to the sole argument, since "Mary" is the one that undergoes the action:

Theta-roles	<THEME>		
	|		
(3a)	Mary	arrived.	
(3b)	*Mary	arrived	an arrival.
adapted from (Pesetsky & Torrego 2002, p. 22 (36a))

The theta-criterion assigns the theta-role in the underlying structure, as shown by (3c). The past-tense morpheme then requires a subject at the spec-TP position and forces the movement of "Mary," as shown by (3d). A verb like "eat" can choose to take an object, as shown in (4):

(4) a. John ate.
    b. John ate something.
    c. John ate a big lunch.
        (Rice 1988, p. 203 (1b-d))

For this type of verb, the potential object is usually semantically limited and therefore can be inferred from the verb at a default value (Rice 1988, pp. 203–4). For instance, for (4a), the listener/reader automatically assumes that John ate "something." What necessitates the object in (4c) is the distinction from the default meaning achieved by specifying what John ate (Rice 1988, p. 208). As a result, this type of verb can be treated the same as transitive verbs. The theta-roles of "agent" and "theme" can be assigned:

Theta-roles	<AGENT>		(<THEME>)
	|		(|)
(4a)	John	ate.	
(4b)	John	ate	something.
(4c)	John	ate	a big lunch.
(Rice 1988, p. 203 (1b-d))

In summary, by assigning the correct theta-roles, theta-criterion is able to tell the real intransitive verbs, such as "arrive" apart from verbs that can appear intransitive, such as "eat."

=== PRO and pro ===
==== PRO ====
PRO (pronounced 'big pro') is a null pronoun phrase that occurs in a position where it does not get case (or gets null case) (Note: There are exceptions. For example, Icelandic PRO is argued to bear normal cases (Sigurðsson 2008)) but takes the theta-role assigned by the non-finite verb to its subject. PRO's meaning is determined by the precedent DP that controls it (Carnie 2012, p. 429). As theta criterion states that each argument is assigned a theta-role, and those theta-roles must consist of a syntactic category that the verb selects even when there is no overt subject. This is where PRO comes in to help satisfy theta-criterion by appearing as the null subject attaining the appropriate theta role (Camacho 2013). Below is an example containing PRO in a sentence:

(5) a. Jeani is likely  [ti to leave].
    b. Jean is reluctant [PRO to leave].
       (Carnie 2012, p. 430 (1))

Example (5a) is a raising sentence, and in contrast, (5b) is a control sentence, meaning it does not involve any DP movement. The PRO, which is a "null DP" is in the subject position of the embedded clause.

(6) a. Jean wants Briani [ti to leave].
    b. Jean persuaded Brian [PRO to leave].
      (Carnie 2012, p. 430 (4)

Similarly, example (6a) is a raising-to-object sentence; "Brian" raises to the object position of the verb want. (Note: This movement won't cause Brian to get a theta-role from the verb want because 1) want only assigns a proposition role to its complement, and that role is already assigned to the clause Brain to leave. 2) Brian in such cases moved to the specifier position of AgrOP rather than directly into the complement position of want. Carnie (2007, p. 411)) In contrast, (6b) is an object control sentence.(Carnie 2012, p. 430) The verb persuade has three theta-roles to assign: "agent" to Jean, "theme" to Brian, and "proposition" to the clause [PRO to leave]. There is no raising, but there is a PRO in the subject position of the embedded clause that takes the verb leave's only theta-role, "agent". Since Brian does not receive theta-role from leave, it only bears one theta-role, nor does PRO receive a second theta-role from persuade. Every argument only receives one theta-role, and every theta-role of the two predicates is assigned to only one argument. The sentence is thus grammatical.

==== pro ====
pro, also known as little pro, is an empty category that occurs in a subject or object position of a finite clause (finite clauses must contain a verb which shows tense) in languages like Italian, Spanish, Portuguese, Chinese, and some Arabic dialects (Jaeggli & Safir 1989; Rizzi 1986). pro differs from PRO in that it contains case. The meaning of pro is determined not by its antecedent but by verb agreement in the sentence. The DP is 'dropped' from a sentence if its reference can be recovered from the context.(Carnie 2012, p. 429) For example:

Theta-roles	<AGENT>		<THEME>	<GOAL>
	|		|	|
(7a)	Un bravo psicanalista (A good psychoanalyst)	può restituire (can give back)	pro	a se stessi (to themselves)
'A good psychoanalyst can return people to themselves'.
(Adapted from Rizzi (1986, p. 504 (11b)))

The verb restituire 'give back' assigns three theta-roles, but there are only two overt arguments in the sentence. It ultimately satisfies theta-criterion because the role, theme, is taken by a pro, whose existence can be proved by the properly bound reflexive pronoun se stessi. Compare (7a) with (7b) below:

(7b) *Un bravo psicanalista può dare aiuto a  se stessi.
      A  good  psychoanalyst can give help  to oneself.
      'A good psychoanalyst can give help to themselves'.
     (Adapted from Rizzi (1986, p. 504 (13b)))

When the reflexive pronoun se stessi 'themselves' doesn't have a proper antecedent to co-refer to, the sentence can't be grammatical. This indicates that in (7a) se stessi must have a proper antecedent in the sentence—the pro that takes the theme role.

=== Cognate object ===
Cognate objects are nominal complements of their cognate verbs that are normally intransitive. For example,

(8) John died a gruesome death.
     (Jones 1988, p. 89 (1a))

Such a structure posed a problem for theta-criterion because normally the verb assigns only one theta-role, theme, which is already taken by the DP, "John." The sentence should be thus predicted ill-formed. To explain the phenomenon, one way is to re-categorize such a verb as "die" so as to change the way it assigns theta-roles. For that purpose, (8) can be interpreted as follows:

(9) John met a gruesome death.
     (Jones 1988, p. 91 (5a))

Or John underwent a gruesome death. If the verb "die" is essentially similar to the operation-verb "meet," the cognate objects should be assigned a theta-role—one restricted to the nominal form of the verb head (Jones 1988). In other words, "die" is now classified as a potentially transitive verb, assigning two theta-roles, agent to "John" and theme to "a gruesome death." Such a possibility is falsified, however, because cognate object constructions cannot be passivized (Jones 1988).

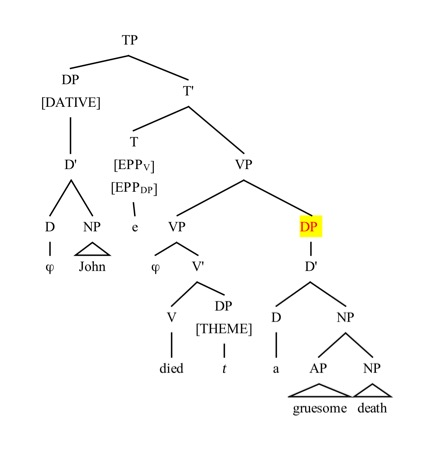
(11c) Tree structure of (11a) "John died a gruesome death." The adjunct phrase is highlighted in yellow. Substituting the adjunct DP "a gruesome death" with the adverbial phrase "gruesomely" will derive (11b).

(10) a. A gruesome death was met by John.
     b. *A gruesome death was died by John.
     (Jones 1988, p. 91 (6a), p=92 (11a))

As we can no longer consider verbs that take cognate objects the same as potentially transitive verbs, Jones (1988) argues, based on the framework of Zubizarreta (1982), that cognate objects are adjuncts rather than arguments, having the same meaning and structure as the manner adverbs in (12b).

Theta-role	<THEME>		
	|		
(11a)	John	died	a gruesome death.
(11b)	John	died	gruesomely.
Jones (1988, p. 89 (1a), p. 93 (12a))

Such an analysis restores cognate objects to the group of arguments satisfying the theta-criterion, as adjuncts, by definition, are not counted as arguments and therefore need not be restricted by theta criterion. The tree form (11c) shows the adjunct DP in its relative position.

=== Deverbal nouns ===
Deverbal nouns are derived from verbs and thus assign theta-roles as their verb stems do. For example,

(12) (i) the barbarians' destruction of Rome
    (ii) Rome's destruction (by the barbarians)
   (iii) the destruction of Rome (by the barbarians)
    (iv) *the barbarian's destruction
   ((Chomsky 1981, p. 104 (7)))

According to Chomsky (1981, p. 104), the constructions in (12) are analogous to "the barbarians destroyed Rome" and destruction needs to assign theta-roles in line with theta-criterion. It assigns "agent" to the barbarians and "theme" to Rome so (i) is fine. The verb "destroy" alone doesn't obligatorily assign theta-role to its subject so (ii) and (iii) is well-formed, too. However, "destroy" must assign a "theme", so (iv) is ruled out.

== Alternative approaches ==
Theta-criterion experienced its golden age in the 1980s when people discussed its application to various languages and structures and developed many other theories from it. However, after the minimalist program challenged some cornerstones of government and binding theory, people started to question the validity of this criterion, especially the number of theta-roles allowed to be taken by an argument. Hornstein and Boeckx, for example, proposed that there is no upper limit on the number of theta-roles an argument can receive during derivation. In their theory, the function of selecting correct number of arguments is shouldered by case theory, and theta-roles are just features on verbs that needs to be checked (Hornstein 1999).

== See also ==
- Theta-role
- Thematic relation
- Argument (linguistics)
- Selection
- Burzio's generalization
- Cognate object
- Empty category
- PRO (linguistics)
- Causative alternation
- Resultative
- Volition (linguistics)
