= Explanatory combinatorial dictionary =

Type of monolingual dictionary

An explanatory combinatorial dictionary (ECD) is a type of monolingual dictionary designed to be part of a meaning-text linguistic model of a natural language. It is intended to be a complete record of the lexicon of a given language. As such, it identifies and describes, in separate entries, each of the language's lexemes (roughly speaking, each word or set of inflected forms based on a single stem) and phrasemes (roughly speaking, idioms and other multi-word fixed expressions). Among other things, each entry contains (1) a definition that incorporates a lexeme's semantic actants (for example, the definiendum of give takes the form X gives Y to Z, where its three actants are expressed — the giver X, the thing given Y, and the person given to, Z) (2) complete information on lexical co-occurrence (e.g. the entry for attack tells you that one of its collocations is launch an attack, the entry for party provides throw a party, and the entry for lecture provides deliver a lecture — enabling the user to avoid making an error like *deliver a party); (3) an extensive set of examples. The ECD is a production dictionary — that is, it aims to provide all the information needed for a foreign learner or automaton to produce perfectly formed utterances of the language. Since the lexemes and phrasemes of a natural language number in the hundreds of thousands, a complete ECD, in paper form, would occupy the space of a large encyclopaedia. Such a work has yet to be achieved; while ECDs of Russian and French have been published, each describes less than one percent of the vocabulary of the respective languages.

The ECD was proposed in the late 1960s by Aleksandr Žolkovskij and Igor Mel'čuk and was later further developed by Jurij Apresjan. Three ECDs are currently available in print, one for Russian, and two for French. A dictionary of Spanish collocations—DICE (= Diccionario de colocaciones del español)—is under development.

== Characteristics of an ECD ==
A complete ECD of a language would provide an entry for every lexeme, construction, or idiom—referred to collectively as "Lexical Units" (LUs)—in use in the language. Entries in the ECD are based on the semantic definition of an LU, and each entry contains a complete list of its collocations and lexical functions as well.

Entries for historically-related Lexical Units which are homophones and share significant semantic component (i.e., meanings) are grouped into larger units called "vocables," thereby acknowledging polysemy while maintaining the distinct status of the independent items in question. The English vocable improve, for example, includes six Lexical Units, each of which is provided a separate lexical entry:

IMPROVE, verb

IMPROVEI.1a X improves ≡ ‘The value or the quality of X becomes higher’

[The weather suddenly improved; The system will improve over time]

IMPROVEI.1b X improves Y ≡ ‘X causes_{1} that Y improvesI.1a’

[The most recent changes drastically improved the system]

IMPROVEI.2 X improves ≡ ‘The health of a sick person X improvesI.1a’

[Jim is steadily improving]

IMPROVEI.3 X improves at Y ≡ ‘X’s execution of Y improvesI.1a, which is caused_{1} by X’s having practiced or practicing Y’

[Jim is steadily improving at algebra]

IMPROVEII X improves Y by Z-ing ≡ ‘X voluntarily causes_{2} that the market value of a piece of real estate Y becomes higher by doing Z-ing to Y’

[Jim improved his house by installing indoor plumbing]

IMPROVEIII X improves upon Y ≡ ‘X creates a new Y´ by improvingI.1b Y’

[Jim has drastically improved upon Patrick’s translation]

The lexicographic numbers (given in bold after the entry word) reflect degrees or levels of semantic distance between Lexical Units within a vocable: Roman numerals mark the highest-level semantic groupings, while Arabic numerals mark the next highest level, and letters indicate the lowest level distances. The four lexemes grouped under IMPROVEI, for example, are considered to be closer to each other than to IMPROVEII or IMPROVEIII, because the meanings of each of IMPROVEI.1b and IMPROVEI.2 actually include the meaning of IMPROVEI.1a. IMPROVEI.1a and IMPROVEI.1b are even more closely related because in English there are many pairs of words—specifically, labile or ambitransitive verbs—that are related by the semantic alternation ’P’ ~ ‘cause_{1} to P’ (as per above, ‘improve’ ~ ‘cause to improve’).

The subscript and superscript numbers attached to words in the definition refer to subsenses (subscripts) and homophonous entries (superscripts) for a word as given in the Longman Dictionary of Contemporary English —thus, “device_{1}^{1}” refers to the first entry for device in this dictionary, first subsense.

== Structure of the ECD entry ==
An ECD entry for a given Lexical Unit, let’s call it "L", is divided into three major sections or "zones":

=== The semantic zone ===
The semantic zone describes the semantic properties of L and consists of two sub-zones:

1) the definition of L, which fully specifies L’s meaning; and
2) L’s connotations (meanings that the language associates with L, but that are not part of its definition).

=== The phonological/graphematic zone ===
The phonological/graphematic zone gives all of the data on L’s phonological properties. Here again we find two sub-zones:

1) L’s pronunciation, including its syllabification, and any non-standard prosodic properties; and
2) orthographic information about L’s spelling variants, etc.

=== The co-occurrence zone ===
The co-occurrence zone presents all of the data on L’s combinatorial properties. It is organized into five sub-zones—morphological, syntactic, lexical, stylistic, and pragmatic.

The morphological sub-zone contains inflectional data including conjugation/declension class, irregular forms, missing forms, permitted alternations, etc.
The syntactic sub-zone has two parts:

a) Government pattern, which describes the elements that L can syntactically govern (arguments, complements, etc.);
b) Part of speech and syntactic features, which describes the constructions in which L can appear as a syntactic dependent.

The lexical sub-zone specifies the lexical functions that L participates in, covering both semantic derivations and collocations of L with other individual LUs or very small and irregular groups of LUs.
The stylistic sub-zone specifies L’s speech register (informal, colloquial, vulgar, poetic, etc.), temporal (obsolescent, archaic) and geographical (British, Indian, Australian) variability, and the like.
The pragmatic sub-zone describes the real-life situations in which a particular expression is appropriate or inappropriate.
