= Nerbonne =

Nerbonne is a surname. Notable people with the surname include:

- John Nerbonne (born 1951), American computational linguist
- Laurence Nerbonne (born 1985), Canadian singer
