= Meaning–text theory =

Theoretical linguistic framework

Meaning–text theory (MTT) is a theoretical linguistic framework, first put forward in Moscow by Aleksandr Žolkovskij and Igor Mel’čuk, for the construction of models of natural language. The theory provides a large and elaborate basis for linguistic description and, due to its formal character, lends itself particularly well to computer applications, including machine translation, phraseology, and lexicography.

== Levels of representation ==
Linguistic models in meaning–text theory operate on the principle that language consists of a mapping from the content or meaning (semantics) of an utterance to its form or text (phonetics). Intermediate between these poles are additional levels of representation at the syntactic and morphological levels.

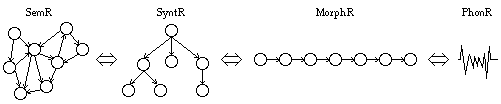
Levels of representation in meaning–text theory

Representations at the different levels are mapped, in sequence, from the unordered network of the semantic representation (SemR) through the dependency tree-structures of the syntactic representation (SyntR) to a linearized chain of morphemes of the morphological representation (MorphR) and, ultimately, the temporally-ordered string of phones of the phonetic representation (PhonR) (not generally addressed in work in this theory). The relationships between representations on the different levels are considered to be translations or mappings, rather than transformations, and are mediated by sets of rules, called "components", which ensure the appropriate, language-specific transitions between levels.

=== Semantic representation ===
Semantic representations (SemR) in meaning–text theory consist primarily of a web-like semantic structure (SemS) which combines with other semantic-level structures (most notably the semantic-communicative structure [SemCommS], which represents what is commonly referred to as "information structure" in other frameworks). The SemS itself consists of a network of predications, represented as nodes with arrows running from predicate nodes to argument node(s). Arguments can be shared by multiple predicates, and predicates can themselves be arguments of other predicates. Nodes generally correspond to lexical and grammatical meanings as these are directly expressed by items in the lexicon or by inflectional means, but the theory allows the option of decomposing meanings into more fine-grained representation via processes of semantic paraphrasing, which are also key to dealing with synonymy and translation-equivalencies between languages. SemRs are mapped onto the next level of representation, the deep-syntactic representation, by the rules of the semantic component, which allow for a one to many relationship between levels (that is, one SemR can potentially be expressed by a variety of syntactic structures, depending on lexical choice, the complexity of the SemR, etc.). The structural description and the (semi-) automatic generation of SemR are subject to research. Here the decomposition takes advantage of the semantic primes of the natural semantic metalanguage to determine a termination criterion of the decomposition.

=== Syntactic representation ===
Syntactic representations (SyntR) in meaning–text theory are implemented using dependency trees, which constitute the syntactic structure (SyntS). SyntS is accompanied by various other types of structure, most notably the syntactic communicative structure and the anaphoric structure. There are two levels of syntax in meaning–text theory, the deep syntactic representation (DSyntR) and the surface syntactic representation (SSyntR). A good overview of meaning–text theory syntax, including its descriptive application, can be found in Mel’čuk (1988). A comprehensive model of English surface syntax is presented in Mel’čuk & Pertsov (1987).

The deep syntactic representation (DSyntR) is related directly to SemS and seeks to capture the "universal" aspects of the syntactic structure. Trees at this level represent dependency relations between lexemes (or between lexemes and a limited inventory of abstract entities such as lexical functions). Deep syntactic relations between lexemes at DSyntR are restricted to a universal inventory of a dozen or syntactic relations including seven ranked actantial (argument) relations, the modificative relation, and the coordinative relation. Lexemes with purely grammatical function such as lexically-governed prepositions are not included at this level of representation; values of inflectional categories that are derived from SemR but implemented by the morphology are represented as subscripts on the relevant lexical nodes that they bear on. DSyntR is mapped onto the next level of representation by rules of the deep-syntactic component.

The surface-syntactic representation (SSyntR) represents the language-specific syntactic structure of an utterance and includes nodes for all the lexical items (including those with purely grammatical function) in the sentence. Syntactic relations between lexical items at this level are not restricted and are considered to be completely language-specific, although many are believed to be similar (or at least isomorphic) across languages. SSyntR is mapped onto the next level of representation by rules of the surface-syntactic component.

=== Morphological representation ===
Morphological representations (MorphR) in meaning–text theory are implemented as strings of morphemes arranged in a fixed linear order reflecting the ordering of elements in the actual utterance. This is the first representational level at which linear precedence is considered to be linguistically significant, effectively grouping word-order together with morphological processes and prosody, as one of the three non-lexical means with which languages can encode syntactic structure. As with syntactic representation, there are two levels of morphological representation—deep and surface morphological representation. Detailed descriptions of meaning–text theory morphological representations are found in Mel’čuk (1993–2000) and Mel’čuk (2006).

The deep morphological representation (DMorphR) consists of strings of lexemes and morphemes—e.g., THE SHOE+PL ON BILL+POSS FOOT+PL. The deep morphological component of rules maps this string onto the surface morphological representation (SMorphR), converting morphemes into the appropriate morphs and performing morphological operations implementing non-concatenative morphological processes—in the case of our example above, giving us /the shoe+s on Bill+s feet/. Rules of the surface morphological component, a subset of which include morphophonemic rules, map the SMorphR onto a phonetic representation [ðə ʃuz on bɪlz fi:t].

== The lexicon ==
A crucial aspect of meaning–text theory is the lexicon, considered to be a comprehensive catalogue of the lexical units (LUs) of a language, these units being the lexemes, collocations and other phrasemes, constructions, and other configurations of linguistic elements that are learned and implemented in speech by users of language. The lexicon in meaning–text theory is represented by an explanatory combinatorial dictionary (ECD) which includes entries for all of the LUs of a language along with information speakers must know regarding their syntactics (the LU-specific rules and conditions on their combinatorics). An ECD for Russian was produced by Mel’čuk et al. (1984), and ECDs for French were published as Mel’čuk et al. (1999) and Mel’čuk & Polguère (2007).

== Lexical functions ==
One important discovery of meaning–text linguistics was the recognition that LUs in a language can be related to one another in an abstract semantic sense and that this same relation also holds across many lexically-unrelated pairs or sets of LUs. These relations are represented in meaning–text theory as lexical functions (LF). An example of a simple LF is Magn(L), which represents collocations used in intensification such as heavy rain, strong wind, or intense bombardment. A speaker of English knows that for a given lexeme L such as RAIN the value of Magn(RAIN) = HEAVY, whereas Magn(WIND) = STRONG, and so on. Meaning–text theory currently recognizes several dozen standard LFs that are known to recur across languages.

== See also ==
- Natural language generation
