= Thematic relation =

Linguistic theory giving noun phrases semantic roles

In certain theories of linguistics, thematic relations, also known as semantic roles or thematic roles, are the various roles that a noun phrase may play with respect to the action or state described by a governing verb, commonly the sentence's main verb. For example, in the sentence "Susan ate an apple", Susan is the doer of the eating, so she is an agent; an apple is the item that is eaten, so it is a patient.

Since their introduction in the mid-1960s by Jeffrey Gruber and Charles Fillmore, semantic roles have been a core linguistic concept and ground of debate between linguist approaches, because of their potential in explaining the relationship between syntax and semantics (also known as the syntax-semantics interface), that is, how meaning affects the surface syntactic codification of language. The notion of semantic roles plays a central role especially in functionalist and language-comparative (typological) theories of language and grammar.

While most modern linguistic theories make reference to such relations in one form or another, the general term, as well as the terms for specific relations, varies: "participant role", "semantic role", and "deep case" have also been employed with similar sense.

== History ==
The notion of semantic roles was introduced into theoretical linguistics in the 1960s, by Jeffrey Gruber and Charles Fillmore. Additionally, Jackendoff did some early work on it in 1972.

The focus of these studies on semantic aspects and how they affect syntax was part of a shift away from Chomsky's syntactic-centered approach, and in particular the notion of the autonomy of syntax, and his recent Aspects of the Theory of Syntax (1965).

== Major thematic relations ==
The following major thematic relations have been identified:

Agent
Deliberately performs the action (e.g. Bill ate his soup quietly). The actions can be both conscious or unconscious (but unconscious actions are sometimes Force rather than Agent). In syntax, the agent is the argument of a transitive verb that corresponds to the subject in English.
Experiencer
The entity that receives sensory or emotional input (e.g. Susan heard the song. I cried).
Stimulus
Entity that prompts sensory or emotional feeling – not deliberately (e.g. David loves onions!).
Theme
Undergoes the action but does not change its state (e.g. I have two children. I put the book on the table. He gave the gun to the police officer. Percival saw the ball.) (Sometimes used interchangeably with patient.) In syntax, the theme is the direct object of a ditransitive verb.
Patient
Undergoes the action and changes its state (e.g. The falling rocks crushed the car.). (Sometimes used interchangeably with theme.) In syntax, the patient is the single object of a (mono)transitive verb.
Instrument
Used to carry out the action (e.g. Jamie cut the ribbon with a pair of scissors.).
Force or natural cause
Mindlessly performs the action (e.g. The water destroyed my computer.).
Location
Where the action occurs (e.g. Johnny and Linda played carelessly in the park. I'll be at Julie's house studying for my test.).
Direction or goal
Where the action is directed towards (e.g. The caravan continued on toward the distant oasis. He walked to school.).
Recipient
A special kind of goal associated with verbs expressing a change in ownership, possession (e.g. I sent John the letter. He gave the book to her). In syntax, the recipient or goal is the indirect object of a ditransitive verb.
Source or origin
Where the action originated (e.g. The rocket was launched from Central Command. She walked away from him.).
Time
The time at which the action occurs (e.g. The pitcher struck out nine batters today.)
Beneficiary
The entity for whose benefit the action occurs (e.g. I baked Reggie a cake. He built a car for me. I fight for the king.).
Manner
The way in which an action is carried out (e.g. With great urgency, Tabitha phoned 911.).
Purpose
The reason for which an action is performed (e.g. Tabitha phoned 911 right away in order to get some help.).
Cause
What caused the action to occur in the first place; not for what, rather because of what (e.g. Because Clyde was hungry, he ate the cake.).

There are not always clear boundaries between these relations. For example, in "the hammer broke the window", hammer might be labeled an agent, an instrument, a force, or possibly a cause. Nevertheless, some thematic relation labels are more logically plausible than others.

== Grouping into the two macroroles of actor and undergoer ==
In many functionally oriented linguistic approaches, the above thematic roles have been grouped into the two macroroles (also called generalized semantic roles or proto-roles) of actor and undergoer. This notion of semantic macroroles was introduced by Van Valin's Ph.D. thesis in 1977, developed in role and reference grammar, and then adapted in several linguistic approaches.

According to Van Valin, while thematic roles define semantic relations, and relations like subject and direct object are syntactic ones, the semantic macroroles of actor and undergoer are relations that lie at the interface between semantics and syntax.

Linguistic approaches that have adopted, in various forms, this notion of semantic macroroles include: the Generalized Semantic Roles of Foley and Van Valin Role and reference grammar (1984), David Dowty’s 1991 theory of thematic proto-roles, Kibrik's Semantic hyperroles (1997), Simon Dik's 1989 Functional discourse grammar, and some late 1990s versions of Head-driven phrase structure grammar.

In Dowty’s theory of thematic proto-roles, semantic roles are considered as prototype notions, in which there is a prototypical agent role that has those traits characteristically associated to it, while other thematic roles have less of those traits and are accordingly proportionally more distant to the prototypical agent. The same goes for the opposite pole of the continuum, the patient proto-role.

== Relationship to case ==
In many languages, such as Finnish, Hungarian, Turkish, and some Asiatic languages like Korean and Japanese, thematic relations may be reflected in the case-marking on the noun. For instance, Hungarian has an instrumental case ending (-val/-vel), which explicitly marks the instrument of a sentence. Languages like English often mark such thematic relations with prepositions. In Korean, agents or other subjects are often marked with -이/-가 (-i/-ga), while -을/-를 (-eul/-reul) indicates a patient, theme, or other object.

== Passive sentences ==
Passive sentences, sentences in which the subject does not perform the action but instead receives it (e.g. The house is being built) can be tricky. They often require thematic reanalysis because the typical order of thematic roles is reversed. In a passive sentence, the patient or theme becomes the subject and the agent becomes optional and can be marked by "by". The posterior left parietal region is used in encoding thematic roles, possibly at the very stage where a reanalysis occurs.

== Thematic roles in the brain ==
While the posterior left parietal area is in charge of passive sentence thematic relations, typical, active sentences' thematic role analyses take place in a wide range of brain regions, including the left temporo-parietal sites, superior temporal sulcus, middle temporal sulcus, and inferior parietal lobule.

One study conducted by Kuperberg et al. (2007) examined that the N400 (a marker for semantic processing) response becomes smaller when a sentence contains a thematic role violation. They tested two possible explanations: Lexico-semantic priming (the wrong word is still related in meaning), or an early P600 (syntactic processing and repair) response that overlaps with and reduces the N400. To test the role of lexico-semantic priming, they compared N400s for thematic relation violations where the wrong word was related in meaning versus unrelated. If priming is the cause, the related violations should show a smaller N400 than the unrelated ones. To test the role of an overlapping P600, Kuperberg and her team compared the N400 for unrelated thematic role violations with the N400 for pragmatic violations (which do not trigger a P600). If earlier findings were mainly due to lexico-semantic priming, then the N400 for unrelated thematic relation violations should look the same as the N400 for pragmatic violations. But if the smaller N400 is caused by the thematic relation violation itself (because of an overlapping P600), then the N400 for unrelated thematic role violations should be smaller than the N400 for pragmatic violations.

== Conflicting terminologies ==
The term thematic relation is frequently confused with theta role. Many linguists (particularly generative grammarians) use the terms interchangeably. This is because theta roles are typically named by the most prominent thematic relation with which they are associated. Different theoretical approaches often closely tie different grammatical relations of subject and object, etc., to semantic relations. In the typological tradition, for example, agents/actors (or "agent-like" arguments) frequently overlap with the notion of subject (S).

These ideas, when they are used distinctly, can be distinguished as follows:

Thematic relations
Thematic relations are purely semantic descriptions of the way in which the entities described by the noun phrase are functioning with respect to the meaning of the action described by the verb. A noun may bear more than one thematic relation. Almost every noun phrase bears at least one thematic relation (the exception are expletives). Thematic relations on a noun are identical in sentences that are paraphrases of one another.
Theta roles
Theta roles are syntactic structures reflecting positions in the argument structure of the verb they are associated with. A noun may only bear one theta role. Only arguments bear theta roles. Adjuncts do not bear theta roles.
Grammatical relations
These express the surface position (in languages like English) or case (in languages like Latin) that a noun phrase bears in the sentence.

Thematic relations concern the nature of the relationship between the meaning of the verb and the meaning of the noun. Theta roles are about the number of arguments that a verb requires (which is a purely syntactic notion). Theta roles are syntactic relations that refers to the semantic thematic relations.

For example, take the sentence "Reggie gave the kibble to Fergus on Friday."

- Thematic relations: Reggie is doing the action so is the agent, but he is also the source of the kibble (note Reggie bears two thematic relations); the kibble is the entity acted upon so it is the patient; Fergus is the direction/goal or recipient of the giving. Friday represents the time of the action.
- Theta roles: The verb give requires three arguments (see valency). In generative grammar, this is encoded in terms of the number and type of theta roles the verb takes. The theta role is named by the most prominent thematic relation associated with it. So the three required arguments bear the theta roles named the agent (Reggie) the patient (or theme) (the kibble), and goal/recipient (Fergus). On Friday does not receive a theta role from the verb, because it is an adjunct. Note that Reggie bears two thematic relations (Agent and Source), but only one theta role (the argument slot associated with these thematic relations).
- Grammatical relations: The subject (S) of this sentence is Reggie, the object (O) is the kibble, to Fergus is an oblique, and on Friday is an adjunct.

== Other issues ==
Some linguists and other academics consider the nature of thematic relations to be problematic. While many believe that thematic roles are "innate, core knowledge" and "cross-culturally universal", others heavily disagree. It is a murky subject and scholars have had difficulty defining it since its emergence in the 1960s. Recently, studies have argued that the agent role is universal but others are not. Not enough data has been published in this particular field to lead to a definitive answer.

== See also ==
- Morphosyntactic alignment
- Case grammar
- Theta roles
- Semantic role labeling, a natural language processing task to automatically determine thematic roles
- Lexical function
- Subcategorization
