= David Dowty =

American linguist

David Roach Dowty (born 1945) is a linguist known primarily for his work in semantic and syntactic theory, and especially in Montague grammar and categorial grammar. Dowty is a professor emeritus of linguistics at Ohio State University, and his research interests mainly lie in semantic and syntactic theory, lexical semantics and thematic roles, categorial grammar, and semantics of tense and aspect.

== Life ==
David Dowty received his PhD from the University of Texas at Austin, with a thesis supervised by Robert Wall and Emmon Bach on the temporal semantics of verbs.

Dowty was editor-in-chief of the journal Linguistics and Philosophy from 1988 to 1992, and associate editor of Language. For several years he was chairman of the Department of Linguistics at the Ohio State University. A one-day symposium was held at the University of Groningen in honour of his sixtieth birthday, subsequently published as Theory and Evidence in Semantics.

== Major publications ==
- Word Meaning and Montague Grammar: the semantics of verbs and times in generative semantics and in Montague's PTQ. Dortrecht, Boston: D. Reidel Publishing Co, 1979. ISBN 90-277-1009-0
- (ed. with Lauri Karttunen and Arnold M. Zwicky) Natural language parsing: psychological, computational, and theoretical perspectives. Cambridge: Cambridge University Press, 1985.
- (with Robert E. Wall and Stanley Peters) Introduction to Montague Semantics. Dortrecht, Boston: D. Reidel Publishing Co, 1991. ISBN 90-277-1142-9
- 'Thematic Proto-Roles and Argument Selection'. Language 67:3 (September 1991), pp.547-619
- (ed. with Erhard W. Hinrichs and John A. Nerbonne) Theory and evidence in semantics. Stanford: Stanford University Press, 2009.

== See also ==
- Syntax‐semantics interface
