= Lexical function =

Tool for describing semantic relationships

A lexical function (LF) is a tool developed within Meaning-Text Theory for the description and systematization of semantic relationships, specifically collocations and lexical derivation, between particular lexical units (LUs) of a language. (Note: The material in this article is based to a large extent on Mel’čuk, Igor A. (2007). Lexical Functions. In H. Burger, D. Dobrovol’skij, P. Kühn & N. Norrick (eds.), Phraseology. An International Handbook of Contemporary Research, 119–13. Berlin/New York: W. de Gruyter. The material in the list of LFs and the sample ECD entry below is reproduced from that source with kind permission of the author.) LFs are also used in the construction of technical lexica (Explanatory Combinatorial Dictionaries) and as abstract nodes in certain types of syntactic representation. Basically, an LF is a function ƒ( ) representing a correspondence ƒ that associates a set ƒ(L) of lexical expressions with an LU L; in f(L), L is the keyword of ƒ, and ƒ(L) = {L´_{i}} is ƒ’s value. Detailed discussions of Lexical Functions are found in Žolkovskij & Mel’čuk 1967, Mel’čuk 1974, 1996, 1998, 2003, 2007, and Wanner (ed.) 1996; analysis of the most frequent type of lexical functions—verb-noun collocations—can be found in Gelbukh & Kolesnikova 2013.

== Standard Lexical Functions ==
Standard LFs form a proper subset of normal LFs. A normal LF ƒ is called Standard if and only if it satisfies both following conditions:

1. Broadness of the domain of ƒ: ƒ is defined for a relatively large number of keywords;
2. Diversity of the range of ƒ: ƒ has a relatively large number of expressions as elements of its possible values and these expressions are more or less equitably distributed between different keywords.

Normal LFs that do not satisfy both Conditions 1 and 2, on the one hand, and degenerate LFs, on the other, are called Non-Standard. An example of a Non-Standard LF is the meaning ‘without addition of dairy product’. It has two expressions in English, a phraseological one—BLACK (with COFFEE: black coffee), and a free one—WITHOUT MILK (tea without milk is not *black tea). This meaning fails Condition 1: it is too specific and applicable only to one beverage. It thus corresponds to a Non-Standard LF.

=== Simple Standard LFs ===
1. Syn [Lat. synonymum] = synonym.

Syn(helicopter) = copter, chopper
Syn(telephoneV) = phoneV

2. Anti [Lat. antonymum] = antonym.
3. Conv_{ijk} [Lat. conversivum] = conversive.

This LF returns for L an LU L´ with the same meaning as L but with its Deep Syntactic Actants (roughly, syntactic arguments) i, j and k permuted —for example, the DSyntAs k, i and j of L are permuted in L´ such that [i→k, j→i, and k→j].

Conv21(include) = belong
Conv231⊃(opinion) = reputation
Conv21(behind) = in front of
Conv21(precede) = follow

4. Gener [Lat. genus] = the closest generic concept for L.

The value of this LF must appear in one of the following two constructions:

1) ‘Gener(L)−ATTR→DER(L)’ = ‘L’ [where DER is any DSynt-derivative, see 6–9 below]; or
2) L, X_{1}, X_{2}, ..., X_{n} and other (kinds of) Gener(L).

Gener(republic) = state [republican state = republic]
Gener(liquidN) = substance [liquidA substance = liquidN]
Gener(arrestN) = reprisals [arrests and other (kinds of) reprisals]

5. Figur [Lat. figuraliter ‘figuratively’] = standard received metaphor for L.

Figur(fog) = wall [wall of fog ≈ fog]
Figur(rain) = curtain [curtain of rain ≈ rain]
Figur(remorse) = pangs [pangs of remorse ≈ remorse]

6. S_{0} = Substantival, output N having a congruent meaning to L (which can be of any part of speech except N):

S0(analyze) = analysis

7. A_{0} = Adjectival, output A having a congruent meaning to L (which can be of any part of speech except A):

A0(city) = urban

8. V_{0} = Verbal, output V having a congruent meaning to L (which can be of any part of speech except V):

V0(analysis) = analyze

9. Adv_{0} = Adverbial, output Adv having a congruent meaning to L (which can be of any part of speech except Adv):

Adv0(followV [N]) = after [N]

10. S_{i} = standard name of the i-th (Deep-Syntactic) actant of L.

For the verb TEACH: ‘Person X_{1} teaches subject Y_{2} to people Z_{3}’

S1(teach) = teacher
S2(teach) = subject/matter [in high school]
S3(teach) = pupil

For the noun LETTER: ‘Letter by person X to person Y about Z’

S1(letter) = author, sender [of the letter]
S2(letter) = addressee [of the letter]
S3(letter) = contents [of the letter]

11. S_{instr} = standard name of the instrument used in the situation denoted by L.

Sinstr⊃(shoot) = firearm
Sinstr(murderV,N) = murder weapon

12. S_{med} = standard name of the means used to bring about the situation denoted by L.

Smed⊃(shoot) = ammunition

13. S_{mod} = standard name of the mode through which the situation denoted by L is realized.

Smod(consider [an issue]) = approach [I consider this issue  ... ~ My approach to this issue ...]

14. S_{loc} = standard name of the location where the situation denoted by L is realized.

Sloc(fightV [two armies]) = battlefield
Sloc(war) = theater (of war)

15. S_{res} = standard name of the result of the situation denoted by L.

Sres⊃(learn) = knowledge, skills
Sres⊃(explosion) = shockwave
Sres⊃(copyV) = copyN, reproduction

16. Able_{i} [Lat. habilis ‘able, manageable’] = determining property of the i-th potential DSyntA of L (‘such that it can L easily’/‘such that it can be L-ed easily’):

Able1(cryV) = tearful
Able1(vary) = variable
Able2(prove) = provable
Able2(trustV) = trustworthy

17. Qual_{i} [Lat. qualitas] = determining property of the i-th probable DSynt-actant of L (‘such that it is predisposed to L’/‘such that it is predisposed to be L-ed’):

Qual1(cryV/N) = sad
Qual1(laughV/N) = cheerful
Qual2(doubtV/N) = implausible
Qual2(laughV/N) = awkward, absurd

18. A_{i} = determining property of the i-th DSyntA of L from the viewpoint of its role in the situation ‘L’.

A_{1} is semantically roughly equivalent to an active participle (≈ ‘which is L-ing’), and A_{2} to a passive participle (≈ ‘which is being L-ed’):

A1(anger) = in [anger] //angry
A1(speed) = with [a speed of ...]	
A2(analyze) = //under analysis
A2(conduct [an orchestra])= //under the baton [of N]

19. Adv_{i} = the determining property of the action by the i-th DSyntA of L from the viewpoint of the role of the DSyntA_{i} of L in the situation denoted by L.

Adv_{1} is semantically roughly equivalent to an active verbal adverb (≈ ‘while L-ing’), and Adv_{2}, to a passive verbal adverb (≈ ‘while being L-ed’):

Adv1(anger) = with [~] //angrily
Adv1(decreaseN,V) = //down [… a decrease of 2.7% = ... down 2.7%.]	
Adv2(applause) = to [the ~]		
Adv2(bombard) = //under bombardment [They came under heavy bombardment.]

20. Imper [Lat. imperāre ‘[to] command’] = imperative expression meaning ‘do L!’

Imper(shoot) = Fire!
Imper(speak low) = Shhh!
Imper(stop [to a horse]) = Whoa!

21. Result [Lat. resultāre ‘[to] result’] = ‘[to] be the expected result of L’:

Result(buyV) = ownV	
Result(lie down) = be lying
Result(have learnt) = know [how],  have the necessary skills

22. Centr [Lat. centrum ‘center’] =‘the center/culmination of L’

Syntactically, Centr(L) is a noun that takes the name of L as its DSyntA II: Centr−II→L, etc.

Centr(forest) = the thick [of the ~]
Centr(crisis) =  the height [of the ~]
Centr(glory) = summit [of ~]
Centr(life) = prime [of ~]

23. Magn [Lat. magnus ‘big, great’] = ‘very’, ‘to a (very) high degree’, ‘intense(ly)’:

Magn(naked) = stark
Magn(laughV) = heartily; one’s head off	
Magn(patience) = infinite
Magn(skinny [person]) = as a rake

24. Ver [Lat. verus ‘real, genuine’] = ‘as it should be’, ‘meeting intended requirements’:

Ver(surprise) = sincere, genuine, unfeigned
Ver(punishment) = well-deserved, just
Ver(instrument) = precise
Ver(walkV) = steadily

25. Bon [Lat. bonus ‘good’] = ‘good’:

Bon(cutV) =  neatly, cleanly
Bon(proposal) =  tempting
Bon(service) = first-class
Bon(assistance) =  invaluable

26. Loc_{in} [Lat. locus ‘place’] = preposition governing L and designating a containing spatial location (‘being in’):

Locin(height) = at [a height of ...]

27. Loc_{ad} [Lat. locus ‘place’] = preposition governing L and designating an entering spatial relation (‘moving into’):

Locad(height) = to [a height of ...]

28. Loc_{ab} [Lat. locus ‘place’] = preposition governing L and designating an exiting spatial relation (‘moving out of’):

Locab(height) = from [a height of ...]

29. Instr [Lat. instrumentum ‘instrument’] = preposition meaning ‘by means of L’:

Instr(typewriter) = on [ART ~]
Instr(satellite) = via [~]
Instr(mail) = by [~]
Instr(argument) = with [ART ~]

30. Propt [Lat. propter ‘because of’] = preposition meaning ‘because of’/‘as a result of L’:

Propt(fear) = from, out of [~]
Propt(love) = out of [one’s ~ of ...]

31. Oper_{i} [Lat. operāri ‘[to] do, carry out’] = a light verb used as part of the expression ‘realize/carry out L':

The DSyntA I of this verb (and its Subject) is the expression that is described in the Government Pattern of L as the i-th DSyntA of L, and Oper_{i}’s DSyntA II (= its Primary Object) is L itself.

Oper1(blowN) = [to] deal [ART ~ to N]
Oper1(supportN) = [to]  lend [~ to N]
Oper2(blowN) = [to] receive [ART ~ from N]
Oper2(supportN) = [to] receive [~ from N] 

32. Func_{i} [Lat. functionāre ‘[to] function’]:

The DSyntA I of this verb (and its Subject) is L itself, and its DSyntA II (its Primary Object) is the i-th DSyntA of L.

Func1(blowN) = comes [from N]
Func2(blowN) = falls [upon N]

If Func_{i} has no object, the subscript 0 is used:

Func0(snowN) = falls
Func0(option) = is open	
Func0(preparations) = are under way
Func0(rumors) = circulate

33. Labor_{ij} [Lat. labōrāre ‘[to] work, toil’]:

The DSynt-actant I of this verb (and its Subject) is the i-th DSyntA of L, its DSyntA II (its Primary Object) is the j-th DSyntA of L, its DSyntA III (= its Secondary Object) is the j+1-st DSyntA of L, and its further DSyntA (its TertiaryObject) is L itself.

Labor12(interrogation) =  [to] subject [N to an ~]
Labor32(leaseN) =  [to] grant [N to N on ~]

34. Incep [Lat. incipere] = ‘begin’:

Incep(sleep) = fall asleep

35. Cont [Lat. continuāre] = ‘continue’:

Cont(sleep) = stay asleep

36. Fin [Lat. fīnīre] = ‘cease’:

Fin(sleep) = wake up

37. Caus [Lat. causāre] ‘cause’ [≈ ‘do something so that a situation occurs’]
38. Perm [Lat. permittere] =‘permit/allow’ [≈ ‘do nothing which would cause that a situation does not occur]’
39. Liqu [Lat. *liquidāre] = ‘liquidate’ [≈ ‘do something so that a situation does not occur’]
40. Real_{i} [Lat. realis ‘real’]

Real1(accusation) = [to] prove [ART ~] 
Real1(car) = [to] drive [ART ~ ]
Real1(illness) = [to] succumb [to  ART ~]
Real2(law) = [to] abide [by ART ~]
Real2(hintN) = [to] take [ART ~]
Real2(demandN) = [to] meet [ART ~]

41. Fact_{0/i} [Lat. factum ‘fact’]

42. Labreal_{ijk} [a hybrid of Labor and Real]

43. Involv [Lat. involvere ‘[to] drag along’] = verb meaning ‘[to] involve Y’, ‘[to] affect Y’

Involv links L and the name of a non-participant Y which is affected or acted upon by the situation ‘L’; Y is DSyntA II of Involv, and L is its DSyntA I:

Involv(lightN) = floods [N = Y, e.g. the room]
Involv(snowstorm) = catches [Nhum=Y Locin N], hits [Narea= Y]

44. Manif [Lat. manifestāre ‘[to] manifest’] = verb meaning ‘L manifests itself [≈ becomes apparent] in Y’

The keyword L, a noun, is DSyntA I of Manif, and Y (= in which L manifests itself) is its DSyntA II:

Manif(doubt) = nags
Manif(joy) = lights up [his eyes]

45. Degrad [Lat. degradāre ‘[to] degrade’] = verb meaning ‘[to] degrade’ ≈ ‘[to] become permanently worse or bad’.

Degrad takes its keyword L, which can be any noun, as its DSyntA I.

Degrad(milk) = goes sour
Degrad(meat) = goes off	
Degrad(discipline) = weakens
Degrad(house) = becomes dilapidated

46. Son [Lat. sonāre ‘[to] sound’] = verb meaning ‘[to] emit characteristic sound’.

Son also takes its keyword, which most often, but not necessarily, is a concrete noun, as its DSyntA I.

Son(dog) = barks
Son(battle) = rumbles
Son(banknotes) = rustle
Son(wind) = howls

=== Complex LFs and Configurations of LFs ===
Simple LFs can be combined to form complex LFs:

AntiMagn(applause) = scattered
IncepOper1(loveN) = [to]  fall [in ~]
Adv1Real1(whim) = on [a ~]

Certain expressions (collocations or derivations) can simultaneously realize two LFs, resulting in a configuration of LFs:

[Magn + Oper1](doubt) = [to] be plagued [by ~] (≈ ‘[to] have [= Oper1] strong [= Magn] doubts’)
[Ver + Oper1](health) = [to] have a clean bill [of ~] (≈ ‘[to] have [= Oper1] good [= Ver] health’)

== LFs in the lexicon ==
Lexical Functions play an important part in the lexicon, which of necessity must include information about the collocational and derivational properties of LUs. In MTT, the LFs for L are included in the entry for L in the Explanatory Combinatorial Dictionary:

REVULSION
Definition
X’s revulsion for Y ≡ ‘X’s (strong) negative feeling about Y caused by X’s perception of Y, similar to what people normally experience when they perceive something that makes them sick and such that it causes that X wants to stop perceiving Y’.

Government Pattern

X = I	Y = I
1. N’s; 2. A_{poss}; 3. A	1. against N; 2. at N 3. for N 4. toward N

1) CII.2 : N denotes something that can be seen or felt
2) CII.4 : N denotes people
[‘C’ stands for ‘column;’ the Roman numeral identifies the column, and the Arabic numeral, the cell in it.]
John’s 〈his〉 revulsion against racism 〈against dismal results of his endeavors〉. John’s 〈his〉 revulsion at the sight of sea food; John’s 〈his〉 revulsion for work 〈for all those killings〉; John’s 〈his〉 revulsion for 〈= toward〉 these scoundrels 〈toward the government〉
Impossible:
John’s 〈his〉 revulsion *at these words [correct expression: ... for these words] [by Constraint 1]
John’s 〈his〉 revulsion *towards these words [by Constraint 2]

Lexical Functions

Syn_{∩}: distaste; repugnance; repulsion;
disgust; loathing

Ant_{i∩}: attraction

Conv_{21}Ant_{i∩}: appeal

A_{1}: revulsed
Able_{2}: repulsive

Magn : deep, extreme
AntiMagn : mild

Adv_{1}: in [~]
Propt: from [~]

Oper_{1}: experience, feel [~]
Magn + Oper_{1}: be filled [with ~]

Magn + Labor_{12}: fill [N with ~]
Adv_{1}Manif: with [~]

Examples He did it from deep revulsion for the bitterness of the sectarian strife. Any revulsion they might feel from fat-ass bastards they ran up against professionally was ad hominem and not ad genus [A. Lurie]. Mary turned her head away in revulsion. I felt no revulsion for her maternal fantasies, only a practical concern. She met his advances with revulsion. Pam was driven to revulsion (by the sight of the dead animal) 〈*The sight of the dead animal drove Pam to revulsion〉. Revulsion at slaughter cut war short [newspaper heading].
