= Thematic structure =

Thematic structure is a concept in linguistics. When people talk, there are purposes in three separable parts of utterances, the act of speech, the propositional content and the thematic structure. Because speaking is cooperative, in order that the speaking can be effective in the conversation, speakers have to pay attention to their listeners’ knowledge, state of mind and level of understanding. Speakers can assume that listeners know or do not know what speakers are talking about.

According to Michael Halliday, the speakers’ judgements about the listeners’ current mental states are reflected in what is called the thematic structure used.

The thematic structure has three main functions:

- To convey given information and new information
- To subject and predicate
- To frame and insert

A thematic structure is a preoccupying conception of a proposition which runs throughout a media text, usually around an initiating topic. It strategically ties together a number of more specific conceptions or statements on the basis of particular social forms of knowledge and social forms of perception and belief. A thematic structure helps to make a media text coherent -- it orients a text around a central theme or a strand of related themes running through a story. (reference: David Deacon(2007), Researching communications, p. 174)
