= John Nerbonne =

American computational linguist (born 1951)

- Born: October 5, 1951 (age 74); Boston, Massachusetts, U.S.
- Education: Ohio State University
- Awards: Humboldt Prize (2012)
- Scientific career
- Fields: Computational Linguistics
- Thesis: German Temporal Logic (1984)
- Doctoral advisor: David Dowty

John A. Nerbonne (born October 5, 1951) is an American computational linguist. He was a professor of humanities computing at the University of Groningen until January 2017, when he gave his valedictory address at the celebration of the 30th anniversary of his department there.

== Career ==
Nerbonne was born in Boston. He graduated from the Albert-Ludwigs-Universität Freiburg in 1979 with an M.A. in Germanic Philology, from the Ohio State University in 1984 with an M.Sc. in Computer and Information Science, and from the Ohio State University in 1984 with a Ph.D. in Linguistics. After that, he worked in industry for eight years: five years at Hewlett-Packard Laboratories, and three years at the Deutsches Forschungszentrum für Künstliche Intelligenz. In 1993, he was appointed as Professor in Humanities Computing at the Department of Information Science at the University of Groningen. He was the director of the Groningen Center of Language and Cognition for fourteen years and supervised over 30 dissertations. In 2002, he was elected president of the Association for Computational Linguistics. Under his reign, Aravind Joshi was awarded the first ACL Lifetime Achievement Award.

In addition, Nerbonne has taught at Ohio State University (1981-1985), Stanford University (1987-1990), Saarland University (1990-1992), the European Summer School in Logic, Language and Information (1991), the Linguistics Institute of the Linguistic Society of America (1993), University of Stuttgart (2001) and was a guest researcher at Nippon Telegraph and Telephone (Yokosuka) for two months in 1996.

== Research ==
Nerbonne's research has ranged broadly within Linguistics and Computational Linguistics. His Ph.D. thesis was completed under the supervision of David Dowty and concerns the syntax and semantics of temporal expressions in German. The grammar fragment there served as the basis for a number of early computational implementations of Generalized Phrase Structure Grammar (GPSG), e.g., in Berlin and Stuttgart (LILOG) and led to several journal publications. After his Ph.D. he pursued computational linguistics in an applied setting, at Hewlett-Packard Labs, where he supervised linguistic work.

His work includes both theoretical and applied topics in computational linguistics, including detecting syntactic differences in corpora, natural language interfaces, semantics, language contact, grammar development, computer-assisted language learning, information extraction and simulations of language learning. Over the last decade, he focused more on creating computational tools for analyzing pronunciation differences, contributing a number of techniques to dialectology. His contributions in dialectology have given rise to the so-called School of Groningen in that field.

Nerbonne has served as associate editor of Computational Linguistics and has published there as well as in the international refereed journals Linguistische Berichte; Machine Translation; Linguistics; Linguistics and Philosophy; Künstliche Intelligenz; Annals of Mathematics and Artificial Intelligence; Journal of Logic, Language and Information; Traitement Automatique des Language, Language Variation and Change; Dialectologia et Geolinguistica; Taal en Tongval; Computers and the Humanities, and Lecture Notes in Computer Science.

== Distinctions ==
- Honorarprofessor at the Albert-Ludwigs-Universität Freiburg
- Knight of the Order of the Netherlands Lion (Ridder in de Orde van de Nederlandse Leeuw 2014)
- Member of the Royal Netherlands Academy of Arts and Sciences (KNAW) (2005)
- Winner of the German Alexander von Humboldt Prize in 2012

== Selected publications ==
- Data-Driven Dialectology. In Language and Linguistics Compass, 3(1), 2009, pp. 175–198.
- Measuring Dialect Differences. With Wilbert Heeringa. In Jürgen Erich Schmidt and Peter Auer (eds.) Language and Space: Theories and Methods. Berlin: Mouton De Gruyter, 2009, pp. 550–567.
- Measuring the Diffusion of Linguistic Change. Philosophical Transactions of the Royal Society B: Biological Sciences, 365, 12 Dec. 2010, pp. 3821–3828.
- Quantitative Social Dialectology: Explaining Linguistic Variation Geographically and Socially. With Martijn Wieling and Harald Baayen. PLoS ONE, 6(9), 2011: e23613.
- Inducing a Measure of Phonetic Similarity from Pronunciation Variation. With Martijn Wieling and Eliza Margaretha. Journal of Phonetics. March 2012, pp. 307–314.
