= Igor Mel'čuk =

Soviet and Canadian linguist (born 1932)

- Игорь Мельчук; Ігор Мельчук
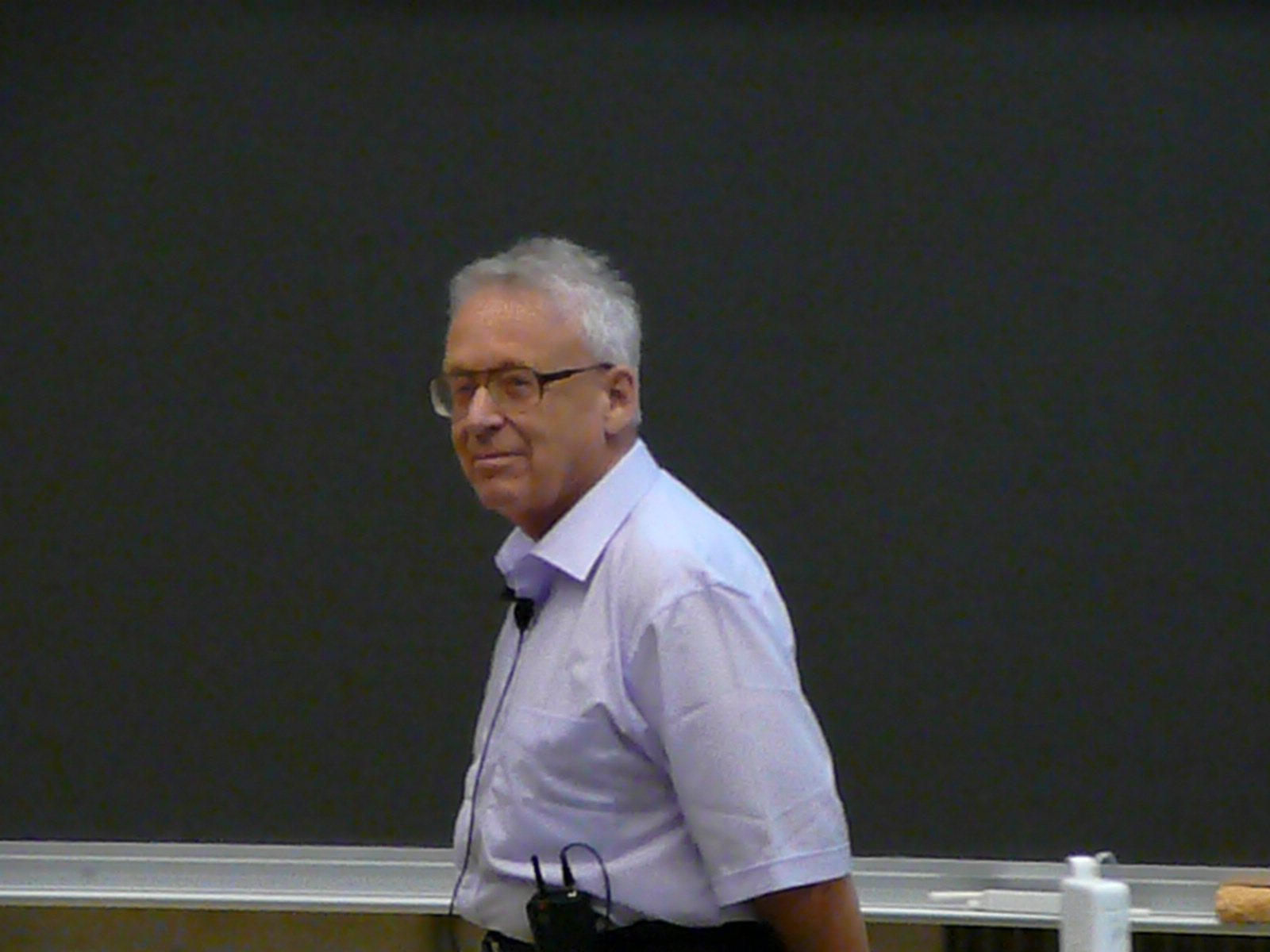
- Mel'čuk in 2006
- Born: 19 October 1932 (age 93); Odessa, Ukrainian SSR, Soviet Union
- Citizenship: Canada
- Education: Moscow State University
- Known for: Meaning-Text Theory

Igor Aleksandrovič Mel'čuk (sometimes Melchuk; Russian: Игорь Александрович Мельчук, Ukrainian: Ігор Олександрович Мельчук; born 1932) is a Soviet and Canadian linguist, a retired professor at the Department of Linguistics and Translation, Université de Montréal.

== Biography ==
He graduated from the Moscow State University's Philological department and worked from 1956 till 1976 for the Institute of Linguistics in Moscow. He is known as one of the developers of Meaning–text theory with the seminal book published in 1974. He is also the author of Cours de morphologie générale in 5 volumes.

After making statements in support of Soviet dissidents Sergey Kovalyov and Andrey Sakharov he was fired from the Institute, and subsequently emigrated from the Soviet Union in 1976. Since 1977 he has lived and worked in Canada.

Melchuk is Jewish.

== Works, 1984–2007 ==
- Co-authors : Arbatchewsky-Jumarie, N., Elnitsky, L., Iordanskaja, L. et Lessard, A., Dictionnaire explicatif et combinatoire du français contemporain : Recherches lexico-sémantiques I, Montréal: Presses de l’Université de Montréal, 1984. 172 pp.
- Co-authors : Zholkovsky, A., Explanatory Combinatorial Dictionary of Modern Russian, Vienna: Wiener Slawistischer Almanach, 1984. 992 pp.
- Поверхностный синтаксис русских числовых выражений — La syntaxe de surface d’expressions numériques du russe, Vienne: Wiener Slawistischer Almanach, 1985. 510 pp.
- Co-authors : Pertsov, N.V., Surface Syntax of English. A Formal Model within the Meaning-Text Framework, Amsterdam: Benjamins, 1987. 526 pp.
- Dependency Syntax : Theory and Practice, Albany, N.Y.: The SUNY Press, 1988. 428 pp.
- Co-authors : Arbatchewsky-Jumarie, N., Dagenais, L., Elnitsky, L., Iordanskaja, L., Lefebvre, M.-N., et Mantha, S., Dictionnaire explicatif et combinatoire du français contemporain. Recherches lexico-sémantiques II, Montréal: Les Presses de l’Université de Montréal, 1988. 332 pp.
- Co-authors : Arbatchewsky-Jumarie, N., Iordanskaja, L. et Mantha, S., Dictionnaire explicatif et combinatoire du français contemporain. Recherches lexico-sémantiques III, Montréal: Les Presses de l’Université de Montréal, 1992, 323 pp.
- Cours de morphologie générale, vol. 1: Introduction + Le mot. Montréal: Les Presses de l’Université de Montréal — Paris: CNRS Éditions, 1993. 412 pp.
- Cours de morphologie générale, vol. 2: Significations morphologiques. Montréal: Les Presses de l’Université de Montréal — Paris: CNRS Éditions, 1994. 458 pp.
- Co-authors : A. Clas, A. Polguère. Introduction à la lexicologie explicative et combinatoire, Bruxelles : Duculot, 1995, 256 pp.
- The Russian Language in the Meaning-Text Perspective. Wiener Slawistischer Almanach/ Škola "Jazyki russkoj kul´tury": Vienne/Moscou, 1995. 682 pp.
- Cours de morphologie générale, vol. 3 : Moyens morphologiques. Syntactiques morphologiques. Montréal: Les Presses de l’Université de Montréal — Paris: CNRS Éditions, 1996. 326 pp.
- Cours de morphologie générale, vol. 4 : Signes morphologiques. Montréal: Les Presses de l’Université de Montréal — Paris: CNRS Éditions, 1997, 488 pp.
- Vers une linguistique Sens-Texte. Leçon inaugurale. Paris : Collège de France. 1997. 78 pp.
- Курс общей морфологии. Том I. Введение. Часть первая: Слово. Москва: Языки русской культуры — Вена : Wiener Slawistischer Almanach. 1997. 401 сс.
- Курс общей морфологии. Том II. Часть вторая: морфологические значения. Москва: Языки русской культуры — Вена : Wiener Slawistischer Almanach. 1998. 543 сс.
- Co-authors : Arbatchewsky-Jumarie, N., Iordanskaja, L., Mantha, S. et Polguère, A. Dictionnaire explicatif et combinatoire du français contemporain. Recherches lexico-sémantiques IV, Montréal: Les Presses de l’Université de Montréal, 1999. 347 pp.
- Курс общей морфологии. Том III. Часть третья: морфологические средства; Часть четвёртая: морфологические синтактики. Москва: Языки русской культуры — Вена : Wiener Slawistischer Almanach. 2000. 367 сс.
- Cours de morphologie générale, vol. 5 : Modèles morphologiques. Montréal: Les Presses de l’Université de Montréal — Paris: CNRS Éditions, 2000. 492 pp.
- Курс общей морфологии. Том IV. Часть пятая: морфологические знаки. Москва: Языки славянской культуры — Вена: Wiener Slawistischer Almanach, 2001. 580 сс.
- Communicative Organization in Natural Language. The Semantic-Communicative Structure of Sentences. Amsterdam/Philadelphia: Benjamins, 2001. 393 pp.
- Курс общей морфологии. Том V. Часть шестая: морфологические модели. Часть седьмая: Принципы морфологического2 описания. Москва: Языки славянских культур — Вена: Wiener Slawistischer Almanach, 2006. 542 ss.
- Aspects of the Theory of Morphology. Berlin—New York: Mouton de Gruyter, 2006. 615 pp.
- Co-authors : Л. Иорданская, Смысл и сочетаемость в словаре = Le sens et la cooccurrence dans le dictionnaire. Москва: Языки славянских культур, 2007. 665 сс.
