= Valency (linguistics) =

Number and type of arguments controlled by a linguistic predicate

In linguistics, valency or valence is the number and type of arguments and complements controlled by a predicate, content verbs being typical predicates. Valency is related, though not identical, to subcategorization and transitivity, which count only object arguments – valency counts all arguments, including the subject. The linguistic meaning of valency derives from the definition of valency in chemistry. Like valency found in chemistry, there is the binding of specific elements. In the grammatical theory of valency, the verbs organize sentences by binding the specific elements. Examples of elements that would be bound would be the complement and the actant. Although the term originates from valence in chemistry, linguistic valency has a close analogy in mathematics under the term arity.

The valency metaphor appeared first in linguistics in Charles Sanders Peirce's essay "The Logic of Relatives" in 1897, and it then surfaced in the works of a number of linguists decades later in the late 1940s and 1950s. Lucien Tesnière is credited most with having established the valency concept in linguistics. A major authority on the valency of the English verbs is Allerton (1982), who made the important distinction between semantic and syntactic valency.

== Types ==
There are several types of valency:

1. impersonal (= avalent) it's raining
2. intransitive (monovalent/monadic) he sleeps
3. monotransitive (divalent/dyadic) he kicks the ball
4. ditransitive and complex-transitive (trivalent/triadic) he gave her a book and they appointed Susan chairperson
5. tritransitive (quadrivalent/quadradic) I bet him a dollar on a horse

An impersonal verb has no determinate subject, e.g. It's raining. (Though it is technically the subject of the verb in English, it is only a dummy subject, that is, a syntactic placeholder: It has no concrete referent, no other subject can replace it. In some other languages, in which subjects are not syntactically obligatory, there would be no subject at all: The Spanish translation of It's raining, for example, is a single verb form, Llueve.)

An intransitive verb takes one argument, e.g. He^{1} sleeps.

A monotransitive verb takes two, e.g. He^{1} kicked the ball^{2}.

A ditransitive verb takes three, e.g. He^{1} gave her^{2} a flower^{3}.

There are quadrivalent verbs that take four arguments, also called tritransitive verbs. Some schools of thought in descriptive linguistics consider bet to be tritransitive in English and as having four arguments, as in the examples I^{1} bet him^{2} five quid^{3} on ”The Daily Arabian”^{4} and I^{1} bet you^{2} two dollars^{3} that it will rain^{4}. However, since the latter example can be restated as I^{1} bet you^{2} two dollars^{3} without becoming ungrammatical, the verb bet is not considered to be a true tritransitive verb (that is, the clause it will rain is an adjunct, not an argument). Languages that mark arguments morphologically can have indisputable "true" tritransitive verbs, which have four necessary arguments. In that case, these arguments may be marked by particular morphology, and may, in the case of polypersonal agreement, be inflected on the verb. For example, the usage of causative morphology with a ditransitive verb in Abaza produces tritranstivity (such as the translation of the sentence "He couldn't make them give it back to her", which incorporates all four arguments as pronominal prefixes on the verb).^{: p. 57}

The term valence also refers to the syntactic category of these elements. Verbs show considerable variety in this respect. In the examples above, the arguments are noun phrases (NPs), but arguments can in many cases be other categories, e.g.

Winning the prize made our training worthwhile. – Subject is a non-finite verb phrase
That he came late did not surprise us. – Subject is a clause
Sam persuaded us to contribute to the cause. – Object is a non-finite verb phrase
The president mentioned that she would veto this bill. – Object is a clause

Many of these patterns can appear in a form rather different from the ones just shown above. For example, they can also be expressed using the passive voice:

Our training was made worthwhile (by winning the prize).
We were not surprised (by the fact that he came late).
We were persuaded to contribute (by Sam).
That she would veto this bill was mentioned (by the president).

The above examples show some of the most common valence patterns in English, but do not begin to exhaust them. Other linguists have examined the patterns of more than three thousand verbs and placed them in one or more of several dozen groups.

The verb requires all of its arguments in a well-formed sentence, although they can sometimes undergo valency reduction or expansion. For instance, to eat is naturally divalent, as in he eats an apple, but may be reduced to monovalency in he eats. This is called valency reduction. In the southeastern United States, an emphatic trivalent form of eat is in use, as in I'll eat myself some supper. Verbs that are usually monovalent, like sleep, cannot take a direct object. However, there are cases where the valency of such verbs can be expanded, for instance in He sleeps the sleep of death. This is called valency expansion. Verb valence can also be described in terms of syntactic versus semantic criteria. The syntactic valency of a verb refers to the number and type of dependent arguments that the verb can have, while semantic valence describes the thematic relations associated with a verb.

== Compared with subcategorization ==
Tesnière 1959 expresses the idea of valence as follows (translation from French):

One can therefore compare the verb to a sort of atom with bonds, susceptible to exercising attraction on a greater or lesser number of actants. For these actants, the verb has a greater or lesser number of bonds that maintain the actants as dependents. The number of bonds that a verb has constitutes what we will call the valence of the verb.

Tesnière used the word actants to mean what are now widely called arguments (and sometimes complements). An important aspect of Tesnière's understanding of valency was that the subject is an actant (=argument, complement) of the verb in the same manner that the object is. The concept of subcategorization, which is related to valency but associated more with phrase structure grammars than with the dependency grammar that Tesnière developed, did not originally view the subject as part of the subcategorization frame, although the more modern understanding of subcategorization seems to be almost synonymous with valency.

== Changing valency ==
Most languages provide a means to change the valency of verbs. There are two ways to change the valency of a verb: reducing and increasing.

Note that for this section, the labels S, A, and P will be used. These are commonly used names (taken from morphosyntactic alignment theory) given to arguments of a verb. S refers to the subject of an intransitive verb, A refers to the agent of a transitive verb, and P refers to the patient of a transitive verb. (The patient is sometimes also called undergoer or theme.)

These are core arguments of a verb:

- Lydia (S) is sleeping.
- Don (A) is cooking dinner (P).

Non-core (or peripheral) arguments are called obliques and are typically optional:

- Lydia is sleeping on the couch.
- Don is cooking dinner for his mom.

=== Valency-reducing ===
Reducing valency involves moving an argument from the core to oblique status. This kind of derivation applies most to transitive clauses. Since there are two arguments in a transitive clause, A and P, there are two possibilities for reducing the valency: passive voice and antipassive voice are prototypical valency reducing devices.:

1. A is removed from the core and becomes an optional oblique. The clause becomes intransitive since there is only one core argument, the original P, which has become S. This is exactly what the passive voice does. The semantics of this construction emphasize the original P, downgrade the original A and are used to avoid mentioning A or to draw attention to P or the result of the activity.

(a) Don (A) is cooking dinner (P).
(b) Dinner (S) is being cooked (by Don).

2. P is removed from the core and becomes an optional oblique. Similarly, the clause becomes intransitive but the original A becomes S. The semantics of this construction emphasize the original A, downgrade the original P and are used when the action includes a patient that is given little or no attention. These are difficult to convey in English.

(a) Don (A) is crushing a soda can (P).
(b) Don (S) is crushing. [with the implication that a soda can is being crushed].

Note that this is not the same as an ambitransitive verb, which can be either intransitive or transitive (see criterion 4 below, which this does not meet).

There are some problems, however, with the terms passive and antipassive because they have been used to describe a wide range of behaviors across the world's languages. For example, when compared to a canonical European passive, the passive construction in other languages is justified in its name. However, when comparing passives across the world's languages, they do not share a single common feature.

R. M. W. Dixon has proposed four properties of passives and antipassives.

1. They apply to underlying transitive clauses and form a derived intransitive.
2. The underlying P becomes S of the passive; the underlying A becomes S of the antipassive.
3. The underlying A goes into the periphery of the passive; the underlying P goes into the periphery of the antipassive. These are marked by a non-core case/preposition/etc. They can be omitted, but there's always the option of including them.
4. There is some explicit marking of the construction.

He acknowledges that this excludes some constructions labeled as "passive" by some linguists.

Other ways to reduce valency include the reflexives, reciprocals, inverse constructions, middle voice, object demotion, noun incorporation, and object incorporation.

=== Valency-increasing ===
This involves moving an argument from the periphery into the core. Applicatives and causatives are prototypical valency increasing devices.

== In syntactic theory ==
Valence plays an important role in a number of the syntactic frameworks that have been developed in the last few decades. In generalized phrase structure grammar (GPSG), many of the phrase structure rules generate the class of verbs with a particular valence. For example, the following rule generates the class of transitive verbs:

VP → H NP [love]

H stands for the head of the VP, that is the part which shares the same category as the VP, in this case, the verb. Some linguists objected that there would be one such rule for every valence pattern. Such a list would miss the fact that all such rules have certain properties in common. Work in government and binding (GB) takes the approach of generating all such structures with a single schema, called the X-bar schema:

X′ → X, Y″...

X and Y can stand for a number of different lexical categories, and each instance of the symbol ′ stands for a bar. So A′, for instance, would be a kind of AP (adjective phrase). Two bars, used here for the complements, is thought by some linguists to be a maximal projection of a lexical category. Such a schema is meant to be combined with specific lexical rules and the projection principle to distinguish the various patterns of specific verbs.

Head-driven phrase structure grammar (HPSG) introduces a handful of such schemata which aim to subsume all such valence related rules as well as other rules not related to valence. A network is developed for information related to specific lexical items. The network and one of the schemata aims to subsume the large number of specific rules defining the valence of particular lexical items.

Notice that the rule (VP → H NP [love]) and the schema (X′ → X, Y″...) deal only with non-subject complements. This is because all of the above syntactic frameworks use a totally separate rule (or schema) to introduce the subject. This is a major difference between them and Tesnière's original understanding of valency, which included the subject, as mentioned above.

One of the most widely known versions of construction grammar (CxG) also treats the subject like other complements, but this may be because the emphasis is more on semantic roles and compatibility with work in cognitive science than on syntax.

== See also ==
- Argument
- Arity
- Case grammar
- Dependency grammar
- Grammatical conjugation
- Lucien Tesnière
- Morphosyntactic alignment
- Phrase structure grammar
- Subcategorization
- Transitivity
- Verb
