= Subcategorization =

Ability of lexical items to specify syntactic arguments

In linguistics, subcategorization denotes the ability/necessity for lexical items (usually verbs) to require/allow the presence and types of the syntactic arguments with which they co-occur. For example, the word "walk" as in "X walks home" requires the noun-phrase X to be animate.

The notion of subcategorization is similar to the notion of valency, although the two concepts (subcategorization and valency) stem from different traditions in the study of syntax and grammar.

== Argument structure ==
Argument structure is the list of selected arguments associated with a lexical category, such as a verb (SKS, 2015). When every predicate, otherwise known as a verb, is used, it selects a specific set of arguments that need to be fulfilled to create a well-formed sentence (Kroger, 2005). These are arguments such as AGENT, PATIENT, EXPERIENCER, THEME, RECIPIENT, and STIMULUS. To illustrate this, the sentence The adults asked if the cats would pee on the sofa, has been broken down into its semantic roles and argument selections below.

	Category (Head)	Selection Restriction: Argument Selection
ask	V	{DP_{AGENT}, CP_{THEME}}
pee	V	{DP_{AGENT}, CP_{LOCATION}}
adults	N	
cats	N	
sofa	N	{(PP_{LOCATION})}

It is necessary to understand the fundamentals of argument structure to understand the idea of subcategorization because subcategorization, as noted above, refers to the sub-categories a verb (or other semantic role) requires (Kroger, 2005). For example, the verb ask from above subcategorizes for a DPAGENT and CPTHEME, otherwise known as a subject and direct object, respectively. In this way, subcategorization is an important piece of information to include in any lexical entry.

== Thematic roles and S-selection ==
Theta roles identify the meaning relation between the constituent and the selected predicate (SKS, 2015). There are eight theta roles: AGENT, THEME, CAUSE, POSSESSOR, LOCATION, GOAL, EXPERIENCER, and BENEFICIARY. Each term indicates the relationship between the verb, predicate, and one of its arguments. This is what is called s-selection, a shortening of semantic selection. S-Selection is an important addition to any lexical entry in order to make them easier to interpret (SKS, 2015). According to the Theta Criterion, every argument bears one and only one theta role (Chomsky, 1965). Below is an example for each theta role (SKS, 2015):

- CAUSE: a cause; The dog bit the child. This made him cry
- AGENT: a person or entity which intentionally is causing or doing something; Joshua intentionally hit him
- EXPERIENCER: a sentient being inside of, or acquiring, a psychological state; Sam hates cats/Josh noticed Alice
- LOCATION: a location; Marianne leaped through the field
- GOAL: a location/being that is the endpoint; Moses gave Josh a toothbrush
- BENEFICIARY: a beneficiary; Susie made cookies for Sarah
- POSSESSOR: a possessor; Shelly owns cats
- POSSESSEE/POSSESSED: what is possessed; Shelly's cats
  - POSSESSEE/POSSESSED is a subset of POSSESSOR which is why it has been included but not given its own role
- THEME: something that undergoes a change, such as location change, or any kind of progression; Josie sent Riven cookies/
- THEME is also commonly used for things that do not fit any other theta role, such as Josie is short or Sarah said that it is foggy

== Projection principle ==
The Projection principle states that properties of lexical items must be satisfied in order to create well-formed sentences (SKS, 2015).

== Locality of selection ==
Locality of selection states that if α selects β, then β appears as a complement, subject, or adjunct of α (SKS, 2015).

== Subcategorization frames ==
In a notation developed by Chomsky in the 1960s, the basic position of verbs in a phrase structure tree would be shown by assigning it to a subcategorization frame. A transitive verb like “make”, for example, was assigned the feature [+--NP] meaning that “make” can (+) appear before (--) a noun phrase (NP). Verbs that take just one argument are classified as intransitive, while verbs with two and three arguments are classified as transitive and ditransitive, respectively. The following sentences are employed to illustrate the concept of subcategorization:

Luke worked.
Indiana Jones ate chilled monkey brain.
Tom waited for us.

The verb worked/work is intransitive and thus subcategorizes for a single argument (here Luke), which is the subject; therefore its subcategorization frame contains just a subject argument. The verb ate/eat is transitive, so it subcategorizes for two arguments (here Indiana Jones and chilled monkey brain), a subject and an optional object, which means that its subcategorization frame contains two arguments. And the verb waited/wait subcategorizes for two arguments as well, although the second of these is an optional prepositional argument associated with the preposition for. In this regard, we see that the subcategorization frame of verbs can contain specific words. Subcategorization frames are sometimes schematized in the following manner:

work [NP __ ]
eat [NP __ (NP)]
wait [NP __ (for NP)]

These examples demonstrate that subcategorization frames are specifications of the number and types of arguments of a word (usually a verb), and they are believed to be listed as lexical information (that is, they are thought of as part of a speaker's knowledge of the word in the vocabulary of the language). Dozens of distinct subcategorization frames are needed to accommodate the full combinatory potential of the verbs of any given language. Finally, subcategorization frames are associated most closely with verbs, although the concept can also be applied to other word categories.

Subcategorization frames are essential parts of a number of phrase structure grammars, e.g. Head-Driven Phrase Structure Grammar, Lexical Functional Grammar, and Minimalism.

== Valency ==
The subcategorization notion is similar to the notion of valency, although subcategorization originates with phrase structure grammars in the Chomskyan tradition, whereas valency originates with Lucien Tesnière of the dependency grammar tradition. The primary difference between the two concepts concerns the status of the subject. As it was originally conceived of, subcategorization did not include the subject, that is, a verb subcategorized for its complement (=object and oblique arguments) but not for its subject. Many modern theories now include the subject in the subcategorization frame, however. Valency, in contrast, included the subject from the start. In this regard, subcategorization is moving in the direction of valency, since many phrase structure grammars now see verbs subcategorizing for their subject as well as for their objects.

== See also ==
- Argument
- Complement
- Dependency grammar
- Lexical item
- Lucien Tesnière
- Phrase structure grammar
- Transitivity
- Valency
