= Slovene verbs =

Verbs in the Slovene language

In Slovene grammar, verbs are a part of speech.

== Grammatical categories ==
=== Persons and numbers ===
Slovene has three grammatical numbers: singular, dual, plural.

It also has three grammatical persons:

1. First person (prva oseba), used to refer to the speaker or a group the speaker is a part of.
2. Second person (druga oseba), used to refer to the listener or for a general subject.
3. Third person (tretja oseba), used to refer to a person who participates in a conversation, when there is no subject (with impersonal verbs) and when the subject is not in the nominative case.

The first and third person are used when talking to children. The second person can be used instead of the first when one is talking to themself and wants to sound detached.

=== Tenses ===
In Slovene, there are four grammatical tenses:

1. The present tense (sedanjik).
2. The past or preterite tense (preteklik).
3. The pluperfect tense (predpreteklik).
4. The future tense (prihodnjik).

=== Moods ===
There are four grammatical moods:

1. Indicative mood (povednik), which is used to state a fact or opinion in any tense.
2. Imperative mood (velelnik), which is used to give commands in the present tense.
3. Conditional mood (pogojnik), which is used to state possibilities or wishes in the present or preterite tenses.
4. Optative or hortative mood (optativ or hortativ), which is used to give commands, for assumptions, and for encouragement in all tenses. In Slovene literature, it is considered an extension of the indicative and conditional mood.

=== Non-finite forms ===
There are several non-finite verbs:

1. Long infinitive in -ti/-či (dolgi nedoločnik) and short infinitive in -t/-č (kratki nedoločnik). The latter is only used in informal situations.
2. Supine in -t/-č (namenilnik).
3. Two present active participles, in -č and in -e, indicating ongoing action.
4. Two past active participles, in -l and in -(v)ši, indicating a past or completed action.
5. A past passive participle in -n or -t, indicating an action having been performed on something.
6. Gerund (glagolnik), indicating an act or a thing being acted upon.

=== Aspect ===
As in all Slavic languages, Slovene verbs are classified based on their grammatical aspect:

1. Perfective (dovršni) verbs represent a completed action.
2. Imperfective (nedovršni) which represent an ongoing action.

Most verbs occur in pairs to express the same meaning with different aspects. For example, the concept of jumping is expressed in the 2 different aspects is skákati, which has an imperfective aspect and can roughly be translated as to be jumping (continuously), and skočíti, which has a perfective aspect and can roughly be translated as to jump (once). While each aspect is represented by a full verb with its own distinct conjugation, certain combinations are not or rarely used in one aspect or the other. For example, imperfective verbs generally lack a past passive participle, while perfective verbs usually have no present participles. Additionally, the present tense has 2 different meanings depending on the aspect of a verb. For imperfective verbs, it has present meaning, while for perfective verbs, it has a future meaning expressing a desire to carry out the action. For example, To kravo hočem prodati. "I want to sell the cow" (compare this with the future tense To kravo bom prodal. "I will sell the cow").

=== Transitivity ===
As well, verbs can be classified based on their transitivity (glagolska prehodnost). Many verbs in Slovene can be both transitive and intransitive depending on their use in a sentence. However, all reflexive verbs, which are marked by the pronoun se (one self), are intransitive.

=== Impersonal verbs ===
There are also impersonal verbs; these can only have forms for third person and participles in neuter gender. These are mostly verbs to describe weather, such as dəževáti 'to rain' and grmẹ́ti 'to thunder'.

=== Voices ===
There are three voices: active (tvorni način), passive (trpni način), and reflexive (refleksivni način). Active and reflexive voice can be in all tenses, while passive voice cannot be in pluperfect or past (and future) conditional.

=== Verb classes ===
Verbs are often classified into six classes, depending on their verbal suffix in infinitive:

- Class I has no verbal suffix, e. g. nésti 'carry' and píti 'drink'.
- Class II has suffix -ni-, e. g. pogrẹ́zniti 'sink, sag'.
- Class III has suffix -e- or -a- and -i- in present stem, e. g. sedẹ́ti 'sit' and kričáti 'scream'.
- Class IV has suffix -i-, e. g. mẹ́riti 'aim'.
- Class V has suffixes -a-, -va-, -ja-, -ˈava-, -ˈeva-, -ira-, or -izira- (but a never changes into i), e. g. tkáti 'weave' and písati 'write'.
- Class VI has suffixes -ovˈa- (hard) or -evˈa- (soft), e. g. kupováti 'buy'

=== Accentual types ===
There are several different accentual types, that can be divided differently. It is rarely divided the same way as in Proto-Slavic because all the accent shifts have made such division impractical. It is usually divided where the accent is situated and thus the verbs are divided into seven groups.

- Accent is not directly before the endings (marked as I)
- Accent is directly before infinitive ending and not directly before present indicative endings (marked as II A)
- Accent can be on two different vowels in infinitive (marked as II B)
- Accent is on other vowel in infinitive and present indicative (marked as II C)
- Accent is on the last vowel (marked as II D); currently, only verb cvestȉ and its derivatives follows this pattern. In the past, verbs píti and īti also followed this pattern.
- Accent is directly before the endings (marked as III)
- Accent is not directly before infinitive ending and directly before present indicative endings (marked as IV)

=== Polite forms ===
Slovene has T–V distinction and has many different polite forms. See T–V distinction in the world's languages § Slovene for when they are used.

- Forms showed here are tikanje forms.
- Vikanje is formed by replacing second person singular with plural, participles are in masculine forms.
- Polvikanje is formed by replacing second person singular with plural, but participles stay in singular.
- Onikanje is formed by replacing second person and third person singular with third person plural, participles are in masculine forms.
- Onokanje is formed by replacing second person with third person, participles are in neuter forms.

== Morphological structure ==
Verbs in Slovene have a complex morphological structure as they consist of several phonemes. The core of a verb form prefixes, roots and root suffixes. Root is the only of these three morphemes that is not optional and other morphemes are added to it. In most cases only one is present in a verb, but there are also verbs with more than one root, e. g. po-mal-o-mešč-an-i-ti 'to urbanize'. Prefixes often indicate a perfective verb. Most verbs have none or one prefix, but some can also have more, such as po-raz-del-i-ti 'split evenly'. Root suffixes are not so common; an example would be drv-ar-i-ti 'cut wood' or po-mal-o-mešč-an-i-ti 'to urbanize'. These parts together convey the meaning of a verb.

The stem is formed by adding a verbal suffix, which influences the aspect (raz-bij-e-m vs. raz-bij-a-m 'break'; the first one is perfective, the other one imperfective) and the conjugation. Verbs have two stems. The present stem forms the base for all forms of the present indicative and the imperative, as well as the present participles. The infinitive stem forms the infinitives, supine, gerund, and past participles.

Stem is then followed by the form suffix, e. g. -ti for long infinitive, -l for past active participle and -i for imperative. The suffix is then followed by the ending, which is specific for each person/number/case. There are also free morphemes, such as delati se 'pretend', lomiti ga 'make mistakes' or hoditi za 'love'.

== Conjugation ==
Only the present indicative, the imperative and the non-finite forms are usually formed synthetically, by changing the form of the verb directly. All other forms are periphrastic (analytic), and are formed using auxiliary verbs or other additional words.

Verbs are separated based on the ending vowel of their stem.

=== Present indicative ===
In present indicative, verbs have mostly the same endings across all declensions, but those following accentual type II D, III, IV, and some following II A can also have a special stylistically marked ending in third person plural. Those that have ending -ø-m have the infix -s- in second person plural and second / third person dual. The extra -e- is added to the endings when the verb stem ends in a consonant. This -e- causes changes to stems ending in -k- or -g- (which have an infinitive in -); these become -č- and -ž- before the present tense endings.

Present indicative endings
Singular			Dual			Plural			
1st	2nd	3rd	1st	2nd	3rd	1st	2nd	3rd	
1st	2nd	3rd	1st	2nd	3rd	1st	2nd	All	II D / III / IV
-a-m	-a-š	-a-ø	-a-va	-a-ta	-a-ta	-a-mo	-a-te	-a-jo	-a-jo
-i-m	-i-š	-i-ø	-i-va	-i-ta	-i-ta	-i-mo	-i-te	-i-jo	-e-ø
-e-m	-e-š	-e-ø	-e-va	-e-ta	-e-ta	-e-mo	-e-te	-e-jo	-o-ø*
-je-m	-je-š	-je-ø	-je-va	-je-ta	-je-ta	-je-mo	-je-te	-je-jo	-o-ø
-ø-m	-ø-š	-ø-ø	-ø-va	-ø-sta	-ø-sta	-ø-mo	-ø-ste	-ø-jo / -do-ø	
*Only if the stressed e is open-mid

The special ending in third person plural are always acute, but otherwise do not change the accent, except for the lengthening of short vowels. Verbs following II B, II C and III can be either acute or allow both accents in infinitive, but that does not affect the further accent changes. Verbs following II D, when accented on the same vowel on the stem as in infinitive also have the same accent. Dialectally, verbs in -ø-m can also omit the -s- infix, and it is common for speakers of Littoral dialect group to add the infix elsewhere, as well as to use the ending -do. Ending -o can also have some verbs in -ø-ti -e-m (those from Proto-Slavic accentual type a/c, and accentual type c if they had accent on a long vowel in the stem) e.g. pletọ́, porekọ́, tresọ́, as well as all vowels in -ø-ti -je-m, e. g. pijọ́.

Forms in brackets are not officially recognized to be correct in standard Slovene. All verbs in -i-m can archaically have short accent on the last syllable in dual and plural, as well as verb īti.

Present indicative accentual changes
Accentual type	Infinitive	Singular			Dual			Plural		
Accentual type	Infinitive	1st	2nd	3rd	1st	2nd	3rd	1st	2nd	3rd
I	rȋsati	rȋšem	rȋšeš	rȋše	rȋševa	rȋšeta	rȋšeta	rȋšemo	rȋšete	rȋšejo
I	mísliti	mȋslim	mȋsliš	mȋsli	mȋsliva	mȋslita	mȋslita	mȋslimo	mȋslite	mȋslijo
I	tískati	tískam	tískaš	tíska	tískava	tískata	tískata	tískamo	tískate	tískajo
II A	bíti	bȋjem	bȋješ	bȋje	bȋjeva	bȋjeta	bȋjeta	bȋjemo	bȋjete	bȋjejo / bijọ́
II A	píti	píjem	píješ	píje	píjeva	píjeta	píjeta	píjemo	píjete	píjejo / pijọ́
II B	zídati / zidáti	zídam	zídaš	zída	zídava	zídata	zídata	zídamo	zídate	zídajo
II C	sejáti	sȇjem	sȇješ	sȇje	sȇjeva	sȇjeta	sȇjeta	sȇjemo	sȇjete	sȇjejo
II C	kováti	kújem	kúješ	kúje	kújeva	kújeta	kújeta	kújemo	kújete	kújejo
II D	cvəstì / cvə̀sti	cvətȅm / (cvə̀tem)	cvətȅš / (cvə̀teš)	cvətȅ / (cvə̀te)	cvə̀teva / (cvətéva)	cvə̀teta / (cvətéta)	cvə̀teta / (cvətéta)	cvə̀temo / (cvətémo)	cvə̀tete / (cvətéte)	cvə̀tejo / cvətọ́ / (cvətéjo)
III	ravnáti	ravnȃm	ravnȃš	ravnȃ	ravnȃva	ravnȃta	ravnȃta	ravnȃmo	ravnȃte	ravnȃjov
III	kričáti	kričím	kričíš	kričí	kričíva	kričíta	kričíta	kričímo	kričíte	kričíjo / kričẹ́
III	žgáti	žgȅm	žgȅš	žgȅ	žgéva	žgéta	žgéta	žgémo	žgéte	žgéjo / žgọ́
IV	vẹ́deti	vẹ́m	vẹ́š	vẹ́	vẹ́va	vẹ́sta	vẹ́sta	vẹ́mo	vẹ́ste	véjo / vedọ́

=== Imperative mood ===
The imperative mood is used to give commands, and only exists in the present tense. There are no forms for the third person plural, and use for first and third person singular and third person dual is stylistically marked.

The following endings are added to the present stem of a verb, to form the present indicative. If the present stem ends in -a-, the initial -i- of the ending changes to a -j-. Present stems ending with other vowels drop their final vowel. If the present stem ends in a vowel followed by -j-, then the initial -i- of the ending is omitted. The endings also cause changes to stems ending in -k- or -g- (which have an infinitive in -či); these become -c- and -z-, respectively before the imperative endings, although colloquially they keep the same consonants as in present indicative (-č- and -ž-, respectively).

Imperative endings
	Singular	Dual		Plural	
	Any person	1st	2nd / 3rd	1st	2nd
-a-m	-a-j-ø	-a-j-va	-a-j-ta	-a-j-mo	-a-j-te
-i-m	-ø-i-ø	-ø-i-va	-ø-i-ta	-ø-i-mo	-ø-i-te
-e-m	-ø-i-ø	-ø-i-va	-ø-i-ta	-ø-i-mo	-ø-i-te
-ø-je-m	-ø-j-ø	-ø-j-va	-ø-j-ta	-ø-j-mo	-ø-j-te
-ø-m	-ø-j-ø / -ø-di-ø	-ø-j-va / -ø-di-va	-ø-j-ta / -ø-di-ta	-ø-j-mo / -ø-di-mo	-ø-j-te / -ø-di-te

Verbs change accent in imperative based on the accent in infinitive and indicative, as well as where in the word the accent is:

- Accentual type II A, circumflex indicative: singular is acute if the accent is not on the last syllable, otherwise it allows both accents, except final open-mid e, which is circumflex. In dual and plural, accent is circumflex if the accent is on the penultimate syllable, otherwise it is acute.
- Accentual type II C and III, circumflex indicative: accent is circumflex if on the last syllable in singular and on the penultimate syllable in dual and plural, otherwise it is acute.
- Accentual type II and III, cute indicative: singular is acute, but allows both accents on the last syllable. In dual and plural, accent is circumflex if the accent is on the penultimate syllable, otherwise it is acute.
- Accentual type III, short accent in indicative: accent is acute, except on the penultimate syllable in dual and plural.
- Accentual type IV: accent is acute except on the last syllable in singular and penultimate syllable in dual and plural, where it is circumflex.
- Some acute verbs following accentual type I can in imperative follow II B (example blískati, čákati). The accent therefore changes the same way as with those.
- Acute verbs following accentual type III that are circumflex in passive participle and the accent is on the same syllable in indicative can be acute or circumflex (example zakrivīti).
- Verbs -glẹ́dati, -štẹ́ti and -umẹ́ti change the accent irregularly.
- All verbs that change the accentuated vowel, except accentual type III, are in many dialects always accentuated on the first vowel throughout.

Imperative accentual changes
Accentual type	Infinitive	Indicative	Singular	Dual		Plural	
Accentual type	Infinitive	Indicative	Any person	1st	2nd / 3rd	1st	2nd
I	rȋsati	rȋšem	rȋši	rȋšiva	rȋšita	rȋšimo	rȋšite
I	mísliti	mȋslim	mísli	mísliva	míslita	míslimo	míslite
I	čákati	čȃkam	čákaj	čákajva / čakȃjva	čákajta / čakȃjta	čakajmo / čakȃjmo	čákajte / čakȃjte
I	glẹ́dati	glẹ̑dam	glēj / glȅj / glẹ́di	glējva / glẹ́diva	glējta / glẹ́dita	glējmo / glẹ́dimo	glējte / glẹ́dite
I	tískati	tískam	tískaj	tískajva	tískajta	tískajmo	tískajte
I	blískati	blískam	blískaj	blískajva / bliskȃjva	blískajta / bliskȃjta	blískajmo / blískȃjte	blískajte / bliskȃjte
II A	krásti	krȃdem	krádi	krádiva	krádita	krádimo	krádite
II A	bíti	bȋjem	bīj	bȋjva	bȋjta	bȋjmo	bȋjte
II A	vstáti	vstȃnem	vstáni	vstanȋva / (vstánite)	vstanȋta / (vstánita)	vstanȋmo / (vstánimo)	vstanȋte / (vstánite)
II A	štẹ́ti	štȇjem / (štẹjem)	štēj / štȅj / (štẹ̄j)	štȇjva / (štẹ̑jva)	štȇjta / (štẹ̑jta)	štȇjmo / (štẹ̑jmo)	štȇjte / (štẹ̑jte)
II A	grísti	grízem	grízi	gríziva	grízita	grízimo	grízite
II A	píti	píjem	pīj	pȋjva	pȋjta	pȋjmo	pȋjte
II A	bráti	bérem	béri	berȋva / (bériva)	berȋta / (bérita)	berȋmo / (bérimo)	berȋte / (bérite)
II B	zídati / zidáti	zídam	zídaj	zídajva / zidȃjva	zídajta / zidȃjta	zídajmo / zidȃjmo	zídajte / zidȃjte
II C	skočíti	skọ̑čim	skóči	skočȋva / (skóčiva)	skočȋta / (skóčita)	skočȋmo / (skóčimo)	skočȋte / (skóčite)
II C	sejáti	sȇjem	sȇj	sȇjva	sȇjta	sȇjmo	sȇjte
II C	razumẹ́ti	razȗmem	razūmi	razūmiva / razumȋva	razūmita / razumȋta	razūmimo / razumȋmo	razūmite / razumȋte
II C	nosíti	nọ́sim	nósi	nosȋva / (nósita)	nosȋta / (nósita)	nosȋmo / (nósimo)	nosȋte / (nósite)
II C	kováti	kújem	kūj	kȗjva	kȗjta	kȗjmo	kȗjte
II D	cvəstì / cvə̀sti	cvətȅm / (cvə̀tem)	cvətȉ / cvə̀ti	cvətȋva / (cvə̀tiva)	cvətȋta / (cvə̀tita)	cvətȋmo / (cvə̀timo)	cvətȋte / (cvə̀tite)
III	peljáti	peljȃm	pélji	péljiva	péljita	péljimo	péljite
III	ravnáti	ravnȃm	ravnȃj	ravnȃjva	ravnȃjta	ravnȃjmo	ravnȃjte
III	kričáti	kričím	kríči	kričȋva	kričȋta	kričȋmo	kričȋte
III	státi	stojím	stọ̄j	stọ̑jva	stọ̑jta	stọ̑jmo	stọ̑jte
III	zakrivíti	zakrivím	zakrīvi	zakrivȋva	zakrivȋta	zakrivȋmo	zakrivȋte
III	žgáti	žgȅm	žgì	žgȋva	žgȋta	žgȋmo	žgȋte
III	trẹ́ti	trȅm	trì	trȋva	trȋta	trȋmo	trȋte
IV	vẹ́deti	vẹ́m	vẹ́di	vẹ́diva	vẹ́dita	vẹ́dimo	vẹ́dita
IV	povẹ́dati	povẹ́m	povẹ̑j / povȅj	povȇjva	povȇjta	povȇjmo	povȇjte

Examples:

- **Pospravi** svojo sobo. (**Tidy** your room.)
- **Pojdimo** se igrat. (Let's play. Literally, Let's go playing)
- Jaz **delaj** in **garaj**, ti pa boš zapravljal. (I **should be working** and **toiling** while you spend the money. – Such use is stylistically marked.)
- Pa **bodi** po tvojem. ([Let] it be your way. – Such use is stylistically marked.)

=== Present active participles ===
There are two present active participles, which are used almost exclusively with imperfective verbs. They correspond to the English participle in -ing, and indicate ongoing or current action.

The first is an adjectival participle. It is formed by adding -eč to verbs with present stem in -i- or those ending in p/b/v + -e- or rarely any other consonant (which lose their final vowel), -joč to verbs with present stem in -a- (the vowel is kept, so -ajoč), and -oč to other verbs with present stem ending in -e-. It declines as a regular soft adjective with fixed accent and is compared periphrastically. Adverb ending in -če is used when the participle is adjectivalized.

Present active participle in -č endings
	Singular nominative				Adverb
	Masculine	Feminine	Neuter	Definite Masculine	Adverb
-a-m	-a-joč-ø	-a-joč-a	-a-joč-e	-a-joč-i	-a-joč-ø / -a-joč-e
-i-m	-ø-eč-ø	-ø-eč-a	-ø-eč-e	-ø-eč-i	-ø-eč-ø / -ø-eč-e
p/b/v-e-m	-ø-eč-ø	-ø-eč-a	-ø-eč-e	-ø-eč-i	-ø-eč-ø / -ø-eč-e
-e-m	-ø-oč-ø	-ø-oč-a	-ø-oč-e	-ø-oč-i	-ø-oč-ø / -ø-eč-e
-je-m	-ø-joč-ø	-ø-joč-a	-ø-joč-e	-ø-joč-i	-ø-joč-ø / -ø-joč-e
-ø-m	-ø-doč-ø	-ø-doč-a	-ø-doč-e	-ø-doč-i	-ø-doč-ø / -ø-doč-e

The accent is the same for all accentual types, however it is differentiated between different endings. The accent is always on the final o or e. o is long close-mid, but can be short in masculine singular nominative form when it is used as an adjective. e is short in masculine singular nominative form and long close-mid in others, but can also be long close-mid in all forms if not used as an adjective.

The accent is acute, except in masculine singular nominative form, where it allows both accents.

Present active participle in -č accentual changes
	Singular nominative				Adverb
	Masculine	Feminine	Neuter	Definite Masculine	Adverb
-a-m	zidajọ̄č / zidajȍč	zidajọ́ča	zidajọ́če	zidajọ́či	zidajọ̄č / zidajọ́če
-i-m	nosȅč	nosẹ́ča	nosẹ́če	nosẹ́či	nosȅč / nosẹ̄č / nosẹ́če
-e-m	bodȅč	bodẹ́ča	bodẹ́če	bodẹ́či	bodȅč / bodẹ̄č / bodẹ́če
-e-m	tekọ̄č / tekȍč	tekọ́ča	tekọ́če	tekọ́či	tekọ̄č / tekọ́če
-je-m	pijọ̄č / pijȍč	pijọ́ča	pijọ́če	pijọ́či	pijọ̄č / pijọ́če
-ø-m	vedọ̄č / vedȍč	vedọ́ča	vedọ́če	vedọ́či	vedọ̄č / vedọ́če

Examples:

- Otrok, ki joka, je **jokajoč** otrok. (A child that cries is a **crying** child.)
- V sobo je vstopil glasno **pojoč**. (He entered the room **singing** loudly.)
- Vprašanje ga je **boleče** prizadelo. (The question **painfully** hurt his feelings.)

The second is an adverbial participle. It was originally the nominative singular of the first participle, which had an irregular form. It is formed by removing -č from the first participle and changing -o to -e. For verbs whose infinitive stem ends in -ova-ti or -eva-ti and some in -a-ti -a-m/-e-m, infinitive stem is used instead. Verbs with present stem in -uje-m usually also take the infinitive verbal suffix, but archaic form is made with present suffix. Again, the accent depends fully on the type of ending and not on the accentual type. If the accent is on the last syllable, then it allows both accents, otherwise it is circumflex.

Present active participle in -e endings
	Ending	Example
-a-m	-a-je	zidȃje
-a-m	-a-je	trepetȃje
-i-m	-ø-e	kričẹ̄
-e-m	-ø-e	hotẹ̄
-je-m	-ø-e	pijẹ̄
-uje-m	(-uje-ø)	vzdihovȃje / (vzdihujẹ̄)
-ø-m	-ø-de	vedẹ̄
-ova-ti	-ova-je	dedovȃje
-eva-ti	-eva-je	plačevȃje

Example:

- **Sede** se je pretegnil. ([While] **sitting**, he stretched.)

=== Infinitives and supine ===
There are 2 verbal nouns: the infinitive (nedoločnik), which can be long or short and the supine (namenilnik).

The long infinitive is the basic verb form found in dictionaries, and ends in -ti.

The supine and short infinitive are formed by dropping the last -i of the infinitive. Supine is used after verbs that designate motion. For example, the supine would be used in the following sentences (the supine has been put in bold):

- V novi svet so odšli **iskat** bogastvo. (They went to the New World to seek fortune.)
- Pojdi se **solit**. (Literally, Go salt yourself. This idiomatic statement is used to express annoyance or refusal)
- Stekli smo **pogasit** ogenj. (We ran to put out the fire.)

When the infinitive or supine ending is attached to an infinitive stem ending in a consonant, that consonant may change, as follows:

- -p-ti → -ps-ti (tépsti, tépem "beat")
- -b-ti → -bs-ti (grébsti, grébem "scratch, scrape")
- -d-ti → -s-ti (sẹ́sti, sẹ̑dem "sit down")
- -jd-ti → -j-ti (nájti, nájdem "find (something lost)")
- -t-ti → -s-ti (plésti, plétem "braid")
- -st-ti → -s-ti (rásti, rástem "grow")
- -z-ti → -s-ti (grísti, grízem "bite, chew")
- -g-ti → -č-i (lẹ́či, lẹ̑žem (lẹ́gel) "lie down")
- -k-ti → -č-i (réči, réčem (rékel) "say")

Infinitives and supine endings
Infinitive		Supine
Long	Short	Supine
-a-ti	-a-t	
-i(-ø)-ti	-i(-ø)-t	
-e(-ø)-ti	-e(-ø)-t	
-u-ø-ti	-u-ø-t	
C-ø-ti	-ø-t	
-č-ø-i	-č(-t)	

However, there is an accentual difference between short infinitive and supine. In addition, accent in supine is in some accentual types different between perfective and imperfective verbs. Short infinitive has the same accent as supine of perfective verbs, except for two irregular verbs detailed below. The accent is determined by the accentual type, as well as stem vowel and the position in a word:

- Supine is circumflex if the last syllable is accentuated, otherwise it is acute, except verbs that are circumflex in the infinitive – these are always circumflex.
- Verbs following accentual type I, II B, II D and IV have acute accent on the stem on same syllable as long infinitive.
- Other accentual types can have short accent on the last syllable, long accent on the last syllable or long accent on non-final syllable.
- Verbs in -č-ø-i and j-ø-ti follow the same accentual changes as other -ø-ti, but the -st changes into -č and -jt, respectively. The examples given below are added just to illustrate those changes and not to have separate accent changes.

Verbs in -č-ø-i usually have short infinitive and supine in -č-ø-ø, but some dialects add -t at the end, which is also common in colloquial speech.

Infinitives and supine accentual changes
Ending	Accentual type	Infinitive		Supine	
Ending	Accentual type	Long	Short	Imperfective	Perfective
-a-ti	II A	státi (stȃnem)	stȁt	stȁt	prestȁt
-a-ti	II A	bráti	brȁt	brȃt	prebrȁt
-a-ti	II C, III	trepetáti	trepetȁt	trepetȁt	zatrepetȁt
-a-ti	II C, III	kováti	kovȁt	kovȃt	podkovȁt
-a-ti	II C, III	peljáti	péljat (-̍a-t)	péljat (-̍a-t)	zapéljat (-̍a-t)
-i(-ø)-ti	II A, III	píti	pȋt / pȉt	pȋt	zapȋt / zapȉt
-i(-ø)-ti	II C	točīti	tóčit (-̍i-t)	tóčit (-̍i-t)	natóčit (-̍i-t)
-e(-ø)-ti	II A, II C, III	plẹ́ti	plẹ̑t	plẹ̑t	plẹ̑t
-u-ø-ti	II A	čúti	čȗt / čȕt	čȗt	čȗt / čȕt
-as-ø-ti	II A	krásti	krȁst	krȃst	ukrȁst
-is-ø-ti	II A	grísti	grȋst / grȉst	grȋst	pogrȋst / pogrȉst
-ẹs-ø-ti	II A	lẹ́sti	lẹ̑st / lȅst	lẹ̑st	zlẹ̑st / zlȅst
-ọs-ø-ti	II A	gọ́sti	gọ̑st / gȍst	gọ̑st	zagọ̑st / zagȍst
-es-ø-ti	II A	plésti	plȇst / plȅst	plȇst / plȅst	splȇst / splȅst
-os-ø-ti	II A	bósti	bȏst / bȍst	bȏst / bȍst	zbȏst / zbȍst
-ø-či	II A	téči	tȇč(t) / tȅč(t)	tȇč(t) / tȅč(t)	pretȇč(t) / pretȅč(t)
-j-ø-ti	II A	nájti	nȁjt	/	nȁjt
irregular		báti se	bȁt se / bȃt se	bȃt se	zbȁt se
irregular		státi (stojím)	stȁt / stȃt	stȃt	postȁt

Some verbs in -a-ti following accentual type II A, II C or III can follow two subpatterns, which are also present in participle in -l. The first subpattern has long accent in supine of imperfective verbs and masculine nominative singular form of participle in -l. The second subpattern transfers the accent to the syllable before and only exists in accentual types II C and III. Verbs in -e-ti -i-m following accentual type III can also have either long close-mid or short open-mid vowel in short infinitive.

Accentual subpatterns
	Verb	Supine		Short Inf.	-l participle (masc. nom. sing.)
	Verb	Impef.	Perf.	Short Inf.	-l participle (masc. nom. sing.)
Regular	trepetáti	trepetȁt	zatrepetȁt	trepetȁt	trepetȁl
Long vowel	kováti	kovȃt	podkovȁt	kovȁt	kovȃl
Accent shift	peljáti	péljat	zapéljat	péljat	péljal

=== Past active participles ===
There are two kinds of past active participle, used with different functions.

The l-participle exists for all verbs, and is used mainly to form the past and future tense. It is further split into two categories; the descriptive l-participle is used only for analytical forms and therefore can only exist in nominative case and always has to appear with an auxiliary verb. The stative l-participle denotes a state of an object and can also be used as a stand-alone adjective, but not all verbs have it.

It is formed by adding -l to the infinitive stem. A fill vowel (schwa, -e-) is inserted in the masculine singular form when attached to verbs with an infinitive stem ending in a consonant.

Past active participle in -l endings
Infinitive	Masculine	Feminine	Neuter
-a(-ø)-ti	-a-ł-ø	-a-l-a	-a-l-o
-i(-ø)-ti	-i-ł-ø	-i-l-a	-i-l-o
-e(-ø)-ti	-e-ł-ø	-e-l-a	-e-l-o
-u-ø-ti	-u-ł-ø	-u-l-a	-e-l-o
C-ø-ti	-ə-ł-ø	-ø-l-a	-ø-l-o
-ø-či	-ə-ł-ø	-ø-l-a	-ø-l-o

Stative l-participle can be the same as the descriptive l-participle (vrẹ́ti → vrȅł/vrẹ́ł), but it sometimes changes to have a fill vowel (otŕpniti → otŕpəł). The accent can also change between the two.

Accentually, masculine form has the same accent as imperfective verbs in supine, with the exception being verbs in -e-ti and accentual type II D, and the tone can also change. In feminine and neuter forms, short accent lengthens if short, and shifts in accentual types II B and II C.

Verbs in -e-ti, when the supine is accentuated on the last syllable, can have either long close-mid or short accent on e in masculine form. Verbs in -r-e-ti lose the e and the accent is on r. Verbs following accentual type II D have short accent on the last syllable.

Tone is determined by the tone in long infinitive and present indicative, as well as accent length and position in masculine form and accentual type. Based on the accent in masculine form, verbs can belong to one of three groups:

1. Long accent on the last syllable
2. Short accent on the last syllable
3. Long accent that is not on the last syllable

Similarly to imperative, the accent of some verbs following accentual type I can also shift to the next syllable. In these forms, accentual changes are the same as for verbs following accentual type II C.

There are also exceptions; verbs in prefix + -živeti that do not have an alternative version ending in -živiti (e. g. razživẹ́ti) and verbs in prefix + -iti, which may change to -jti (e. g. najti) allow both accents in masculine form, the latter ones also in all other forms.

It further declines as a regular fixed or mobile accent adjective and is compared periphrastically. Other forms have the same accent as neuter gender.

Past active participle in -l accentual changes
Accentual type	Infinitive → present	Used as a participle			Notes
Accentual type	Infinitive → present	Masculine	Feminine	Neuter	Notes
I	V̑ → V̑	rȋsał	rȋsala	rȋsalo	
I	V́ → V̑	otŕpnił	otr̄pnila	otŕpnilo	
I	V́ → V́	tískał	tískala	tískalo	
II A	V́ → V̑	obȗł (1)	obúla	obūlo	
II A	V́ → V̑	krȃdəł (2 or 3)	krádla	krádlo	
II A	V́ → V́	pȋł (1)	píla	pȋlo	
II A	V́ → V́	mlȅł (2)	mlẹ́la	mlẹ́lo	
II A	V́ → V́	klȁł (2)	klȃla	klálo	If a is accented.
II A	V́ → V́	grȋzəł (3)	grízla	grízlo	
II A	V́ → V́	sọ́pəł / sópəł (3)	sópla	sóplo	If the accent in masculine singular form is on the open-mid vowel, ə, or if all other forms but masculine singular have open-mid vowel, except if they have a consonant cluster tl/dl.
II A	V́ → V́	brẹ̄dəł / brēdəł (3)	brédla	brédlo	If the accent in masculine singular form is on the open-mid vowel, ə, or if all other forms but masculine singular have open-mid vowel and they have a consonant cluster tl/dl.
II B	V́ → V́	zídał	zidȃla / zídala (styl.)	zidálo / zídalo (styl.)	
II C	V́ → V̑	sejȃł (1)	sejāla	sejȃlo	
II C	V́ → V̑	razumẹ̄ł (2)	razumẹ̄la	razumẹ́lo	If the verb ends in -e-ti.
II C	V́ → V̑	kupovȁł (2)	kupovȃla	kupoválo	If the verb ends in -a-ti.
II C	V́ → V̑	skóčił (3)	skočȋla	skočílo	If the verb ends in -i-ti.
II C	V́ → V́	kovȃł (1)	kovála	kovȃlo	
II C	V́ → V́	hóteł (2 or 3)	hotẹ̄la	hotẹ́lo	If the verb ends in -e-ti. hotẹ́ti is irregular, but used to illustrate accent in masculine form when it is not short.
II C	V́ → V́	iskȁł (2)	iskȃla	iskálo	If the verb ends in -a-ti.
II C	V́ → V́	nósił (3)	nosȋla	nosílo	If the verb ends in -i-ti.
II D	V̏ → V̏	cvətə̏ł / (cvə̀təł)	cvətlȁ / (cvə̀tla)	cvətlȍ / (cvə̀tlo)	
III	V́ → V̑	smẹ̑ł (1)	smẹ̄la	smẹ̄lo	
III	V́ → V̑	smȅł (2 or 3)	smẹ̄la	smẹ́lo	If the verb ends in -e-ti.
III	V́ → V̑	péljał (3)	peljȃla	peljálo	If the verb ends in -a-ti.
III	V́ → V́	spȃł (1)	spála	spȃlo	If the verb ends in -a-ti or -i-ti.
III	V́ → V́	zelenẹ́ł (1)	zelenẹ̄la	zelenẹ̄lo	If the verb ends in -e-ti.
III	V́ → V́	báł se (1)	bála se	bálo se	Only verbs báti se and státi (stojim)
III	V́ → V́	kléčał (2 or 3)	klečȃla	klečálo	If the verb ends in -a-ti.
III	V́ → V́	žéleł (2 or 3)	želẹ̄la	želẹ́lo	If the verb ends in -e-ti. želẹ́ti is irregular, but used to illustrate accent in masculine form when it is not short.
III	V́ → V́	pomnọ̑žił (2 or 3)	pomnožíla	pomnožȋlo	If the verb ends in -i-ti.
III	V́ → V́	jẹ̑dəł (3)	jẹ́dla	jẹ́dlo	If the verb ends in C-ø-ti.
III	V́ → V̏	žgȃł (1)	žgála	žgȃlo	
III	V́ → V̏	začẹ̑ł (1)	začẹ̄la	začẹ́lo	Verbs in -č-e-ti.
III	V́ → V̏	tkȁł (2)	tkȃla	tkálo	
III	V́ → V̏	dospȅł (2)	dospẹ̄la	dospẹ́lo	If e is accented in feminine form.
IV	V́ → V́	vẹ́deł	vẹ̄dela	vẹ́delo	

Types where accent shifts between forms, however, can vary widely between dialects. Verbs following accentual type II A colloquially prefer to have fixed accent. Verbs in -i-ti can also have fixed accent on the first syllable.

Stative participles decline as regular hard adjectives with fixed accent and are compared periphrastically. Examples:

- **Videl** sem. (I **saw**.)
- Ob tej novici je **prebledela**. (Upon [hearing] the news, she **became pale**.)

The š-participle is also an adjectival participle, and is rarely used in modern Slovene and mostly as an adverb. It denotes completed action, and is equivalent to the English construct with having + past participle. It is formed by adding -vši to the infinitive stem. The ending is only -ši if the infinitive stem ends in a consonant. Accent is almost always circumflex and on the penultimate syllable, some can also have the same accent as l-participle (example vídeti). e before -vši is always close-mid, but o and e before -ši are the same as in l-participle.

The only example of š-participle used in modern Slovene is bȋvši, meaning "ex", but aside from that few other verbs have commonly used š-participle as an adjective.

Past active participle in -š endings and accent
	Infinitive	Masculine	Feminine	Neuter	Adverb
-a-ti	izdẹ́lati	(izdelȃvši)	(izdelȃvša)	(izdelȃvše)	izdelȃvši
-i-ti	spodbudīti	(spodbudȋvši)	(spodbudȋvša)	(spodbudȋvše)	spodbudȋvši
-e-ti	zadẹ́ti	(zadẹ̑vši)	(zadẹ̑vša)	(zadẹ̑vše)	zadẹ̑vši
-u-ti	čúti	(čȗvši)	(čȗvša)	(čȗvše)	čȗvši
-ø-ti	prisẹ́sti	prisẹ̑dši	prisẹ̑dša	prisẹ̑dše	prisẹ̑dši
-ø-ti	splésti	(splȇtši)	(splȇtša)	(splȇtše)	splȇtši
-ø-ti	píti	(pȋvši)	(pȋvša)	(pȋvše)	pȋvši
	vídeti	(vidẹ̑vši) / (vídevši)	(vidẹ̑vša) / (vídevša)	(vidẹ̑vše) / (vídevše)	vidẹ̑vši / vídevši

Examples:

- **Stopivši** iz hiše, se je napotil v krčmo. (**Having stepped** out of the house, he headed to the pub.)
- **Prišedši** gost se je usedel za mizo. (**Having come** guest sat down by the table.)

=== Past passive participle ===
This participle corresponds to the English participle in -ed or -en, and is an adjective that indicates a state of having undergone an action. It exists only for transitive verbs, and almost only if they are perfective. It is formed with two possible suffixes, -n or -t, but further formation is affected by stem, as well as accentual type. Similarly to l-participle, it is also divided into descriptive and stative passive participle.

Both accentual type and stem affect the accent position, which is marked with ˈ in the following table. If it is not marked, then it is on the same syllable on the stem as in long infinitive. All accents are long, except in -i-ti -i-m and es-ø-ti / os-ø-ti forms, as well as accentual type II D, which are short if marked.

Participle further declines as a regular fixed accent adjective and is compared periphrastically.

Masculine singular ending in past passive participle
	I	II a	II b	II c	II d	III	IV
-a(-ø)-ti	-a-n	-a̍-ø-n	-a-n	-a̍-n	/	-a̍-n	-a-n
-i-ti -i-m	-je-n	/	-je-n	-je-n	/	-je̍-n	/
-i(-ø)-ti -(j)e-m	-je-n	-i̍-ø-t	-je-n	-je-n	/	/	/
-e(-ø)-ti	-e-n	-e̍-ø-t / -̍ø-ø-t*	/	-e̍-ø-t / -̍ø-ø-t*	/	-e̍-ø-t / -̍ø-ø-t*	-e-n
-u-ø-ti	/	-u̍-ø-t	/	/	/	/	/
as-ø-ti is-ø-ti ẹs-ø-ti ọs-ø-ti	/	-e-n	/	/	-e̍-n	/	/
es-ø-ti os-ø-ti	/	-e̍-n	/	/	/	/	/

When stem ending in a consonant is followed by j, it iotizes.

* These forms follow verbs ending in -r-e-ti (e. g. drẹ́ti, dȓt "gush, shout").

The t-participle is always circumflex, while n-participle is circumflex or acute, depending on the accentual type, and accent in infinitive and present indicative:

Past passive participle in -n accentual changes
Accentual type	Infinitive → present	Masculine	Feminine	Neuter	Notes
I	V̑ → V̑	rȋsan	rȋsana	rȋsano	
I	V́ → V̑	mȋšljen	mȋšljena	mȋšljeno	
I	V́ → V́	tískan	tískana	tískano	
II A	V́ → V̑	krȃden	krȃdena	krȃdeno	
II A	V́ → V́	ogrȋzen	ogrȋzena	ogrȋzeno	
II A	V́ → V́	prebrán	prebrána	prebráno	If the accent is on -a-n.
II A	V́ → V́	prenesȅn	preneséna	preneséno	If the accent is on -e-n.
II A	V́ → V́	nājden	nājdena	nājdeno	verbs derived from īti.
II B	V́ → V́	zídan	zídana	zídano	
II C	V́ → V̑	zaskọ̑čen	zaskọ̑čena	zaskọ̑čeno	If the accent is on the same vowel as in present indicative.
II C	V́ → V̑	kupován	kupována	kupováno	If the accent is not on the same vowel as in present indicative and does not have long stress on the last syllable in l-participle.
II C	V́ → V̑	posejān	posejāna	posejāno	If the accent is not on the same vowel as in present indicative and has long stress on the last syllable in l-participle.
II C	V́ → V́	podkován	podkována	podkováno	
II D	V̏ → V̏	razcvətȅn	razcvəténa	razcvəténo	
III	V́ → V̑	poravnán	poravnána	poravnáno	
III	V́ → V́	zakrȋvljen	zakrȋvljena	zakrȋvljeno	
III	V́ → V́	zaspán	zaspána	zaspáno	If the accent is on -a-n.
III	V́ → V́	zadušȅn	zadušéna	zadušéno	If the accent is on -e-n.
III	V́ → V́	rójen	rojéna	rojéno	Exception.
III	V́ → V́	ogrọ̄žen	ogrọ̄žena	ogrọ̄ženo	Exception. Same pattern also follows slāvljen.
III	V́ → V̏	žgán	žgána	žgáno	
IV	V́ → V́	zapovẹ̑dan	zapovẹ̑dana	zapovẹ̑dano	

Examples of this participle are:

- **Parkiran** avto je bil ukraden. (The **parked** car was stolen.) (perhaps better in the active voice, "**Parkiran** avto so ukradli.")
- Sodišče je sodilo **obtožen**emu roparju. (The court tried the **accused** robber.)
- **Spočit** konj je čakal na dvorišču. (A **rested** horse was waiting on the yard.)

=== Gerund ===
Gerund is formed by adding an ending -je to the past passive participle. Accent position is the same as in the passive participle and accent is the same as in long infinitive, except when on -a-n-je or -e-n-je, when it becomes (apart from some irregularities) circumflex and acute, respectively. Some can also be archaically accented on the last syllable with a short accent. There are also some irregular gerunds, such as họ́ja.

Gerund is also split into two categories, but most verbs can have both (i. e. is not one or the other as is the case with participles). There is the true gerund (pravi glagolnik), which means an act of doing something, and objectified gerund (glagolnik opredmetenega dejanja), which means a thing being acted upon. Not all verbs also have objectified gerund.

Gerund declines as a regular soft o-stem nouns following first neuter declension, but some can be singularia tantum.

Gerund accentual changes
	Passive participle	True gerund in singular		Objectified gerund in singular	
	Passive participle	Nominative	Genitive	Nominative	Genitive
Most	rȋsan	rȋsanje	rȋsanja	rȋsanje	rȋsanja
Accent on -a-n-je	kován	kovȃnje	kovȃnja	kovȃnje	kovȃnja
Accent on -e-n-je	trpljȅn	trpljénje	trpljénja	trpljénje	trpljénja
Ending accent	vpȋt	vpitjȅ (arch.) vpitjẹ́ (obs.)	vpitjȁ (arch.) vpitjá (obs.)	vpitjȅ (arch.) vpitjẹ́ (obs.)	vpitjȁ (arch.) vpitjá (obs.)
Accentual type II B, verbs in -a-ti	zídan	zídanje / zidȃnje	zídanja / zidȃnja	zídanje / zidȃnje	zídanja / zidȃnja
Different gerunds	šívan	šívanje / šivȃnje	šívanja / šivȃnja	šivȃnje	šivȃnja
Irregular accent shift	mȋšljen	mišljénje	mišljénja	mišljénje	mišljénja
Irregular (spáti)	spán	spánje	spánja	/	/
Irregular (státi stȃnem)	*stȃn	stānje	stānja	stānje	stānja
*This form does not exist and is there only for demonstrative purposes.

=== Negative forms ===
Three verbs, bīti, imẹ́ti, and hotẹ́ti have special negative forms in present indicative:

Negative present indicative forms
Infinitive	Singular			Dual			Plural		
Infinitive	1st	2nd	3rd	1st	2nd	3rd	1st	2nd	3rd
bīti	nísem	nísi	ní	nísva	nísta	nísta	nísmo	níste	níso
imẹ́ti	nȋmam / nímam (styl.)	nȋmaš / nímaš (styl.)	nȋma / níma (styl.)	nȋmava / nímava (styl.)	nȋmata / nímata (styl.)	nȋmata / nímata (styl.)	nȋmamo / nímamo (styl.)	nȋmate / nímate (styl.)	nȋmajo / nímajo (styl.)
hotẹ́ti	nọ́čem / néčem (styl.) / nẹ́čem (arch.)	nọ́češ / néčeš (styl.) / nẹ́češ (arch.)	nọ́če / néče (styl.) / nẹ́če (arch.)	nọ́čeva / néčeva styl.) / nẹ́čeva (arch.)	nọ́četa / néčeta (styl.) / nẹ́četa (arch.)	nọ́četa / néčeta (styl.) / nẹ́četa (arch.)	nọ́čemo / néčemo (styl.) / nẹ́čemo (arch.)	nọ́čete / néčete (styl.) / nẹ́čete (arch.)	nọ́čejo / néčejo (styl.) / nẹ́čejo (arch.)

=== Future indicative ===
Only verbs bīti and īti have special future indicative forms. For bīti, this is the only correct way (but is colloquially also conjugated as other verbs), while īti can also be conjugated as other verbs.

Future indicative forms
Infinitive	Singular			Dual			Plural		
Infinitive	1st	2nd	3rd	1st	2nd	3rd	1st	2nd	3rd
bīti	bom / bodem (arch.)	boš / bodeš (arch.)	bo / bode (arch.)	bova / bodeva (arch.)	bosta / bota (styl.) / bodeta (arch.)	bosta / bota (styl.) / bodeta (arch.)	bomo / bodemo (arch.)	boste / bote (styl.) / bodete (arch.)	bodo / bojo (styl.) / bodejo (arch.)
īti	pọ́jdem	pọ́jdeš	pọ́jde	pọ́jdeva	pọ́jdeta	pọ́jdeta	pọ́jdemo	pọ́jdete	pọ́jdejo

=== Conditional ===
Verb bīti also has a special form when used as an auxiliary verb in conditional mood and is the same for all genders and persons: bi. Full lexical verb therefore still has an analytical form bi bȉl. In an affirmative sentence, it is not stressed, however its negative forms can be accented either on né or on bi (né bi or ne bȉ).

=== Aorist and imperfect ===
Standard Slovene lost both the aorist and the imperfect, which have been replaced by the preterite. These forms exist exclusively in the Resian dialect, but are slowly fading as well. In nowaday Resian, only the verbs bə̀t (SS bīti) "be", díwat (SS dẹ́vati) "give", dujájat (SS dohájati) "keep up with", mé̤t (SS imẹ́ti), moré̤t (SS móči) "be able", parájat (SS prihȃjati) "come", and té̤t (SS hotẹ́ti) "want" still have imperfective forms, others are considered obsolete.

Only a few verbs also have an aorist, and all of these forms are considered obsolete as they cannot be understood by most people anymore. There are only three such documented forms:

- hardúh (SS from īti) "(I) have gone"
- pridúh (SS from príti) "(I) have come"
- vzê (SS from vzẹ́ti) "(you) have taken / (he/she/it) has taken"

Aorist and imperfect have been in use in other dialects until the 15th century and vowel clusters in imperfect have already been contracted then.

== Analytical forms ==
Forms given here are in the way they appear in a typical sentence. However, in the dictionary form, lexical verb is first and then everything else, except in negative forms (e. g. naj bi bil delal → delal naj bi bil)

=== Active voice ===
==== Past indicative ====
The past (or preterite) indicative is used to indicate events that occurred in the past. Modern Slovene does not distinguish the past tense ("saw") from the perfect tense ("have seen"); this distinction was common in Alpine Slovene when aorist served the past tense form.

It is formed with the auxiliary verb biti (to be) in the present tense, plus the l-participle of the verb. The participle must agree with the subject in number and gender. For example:

- sem videl (I saw, said by a male)
- sem videla (I saw, said by a female)
- je odšla (she went)
- so odkrili (they discovered)

==== Pluperfect indicative ====
The pluperfect indicative is used to indicate an action that occurred before some other future action. It is rarely used in colloquial speech, where it is replaced by the past tense.

It is formed as though it were the past tense of the past tense: the auxiliary verb biti (to be) in the present tense, plus the l-participle of the verb biti (to be), plus the l-participle of the verb. The participles must agree with the subject in number and gender. For example:

- sem bil videl (I had seen, said by a male)
- sem bila videla (I had seen, said by a female)
- je bila odšla (she had gone)
- so bili odkrili (they had discovered)

==== Future indicative ====
The future indicative tense is used to state events that will happen in the future.

The verb biti (to be) has its own unique set of future tense forms, with the stem bo-. Other verbs are usually formed using biti in the future tense, plus the l-participle of the verb. The participle must agree with the subject in number and gender. For example:

- videl bom (I will see, said by a male)
- videla bom (I will see, said by a female)
- odšla bo (she will go)
- bodo odkrili (they will discover)

Dialectally, hoteti is used in future indicative as an auxiliary verb, followed by infinitive.

==== Conditional mood ====
The conditional mood is used to express desires, wishes, and hypothetical (often impossible) conditions.

The present conditional is formed using the special particle bi, plus the l-participle of the lexical verb. The past conditional is rarely used, like the pluperfect, and is formed analogously: the particle bi, plus l-participle of the verb biti (to be), plus the l-participle of the verb. Examples of the conditional mood are:

- Če bi mi postalo slabo, mi, prosim, podajte tiste tablete. (Literally: If it became sick to me, to me, I kindly ask, pass those pills.; If I should become sick, kindly pass me those pills.)
- V primeru, da bi prišlo do požara, bomo umrli. (Should there be a fire, we would die.)
- Če bi (bili) končali prej, bi bili zdaj prosti. (If we had finished earlier, we would be free now.)
- Želi si, da bi bil maneken, vendar s svojimi obraznimi nečistočami nima možnosti. (He wishes that he were a model, but with his facial impurities, he has no chance.)
- O, da bi bila jesen! (O, if only it were autumn!) (literary)
- O, ko bi le bila jesen! (O, if only it were autumn!)

In the 18th century, future conditional was also rarely used, which was formed by bom bil + l-participle, e. g. bom bil baral (If I asked [in the future]). Such use has only been recorded to be in active voice.

==== Optative ====
An additional kind of imperative, which may be called the optative or hortative, is formed by using the particle naj (ne) with the indicative or conditional. This acts as a substitute for the imperative in the third person and other tenses as well. It is usually not translated as 'may', because nowadays use is closer to the imperative, so a more appropriate word would be 'should'. However, this kind of form has many uses, so it may also sometimes be translated as 'let' or with passive voice.

- On naj mi pride pomagat. (He should come to help me.)
- Pa naj bo po tvojem. (Let it be your way.)
- Naj ti povem, kako se je zgodilo. (Let me tell you, how it happened.)
- A naj je bil še tako utrujen, je dospel do cilja. (But let him be so tired, he reached the finish [line]).
- Ta proces naj bi povzročale glivice. (This process is thought to be caused by fungi.)

==== Negative forms ====
It is formed by simply adding né in front of the verb, only naj is before. In dictionary forms, the lexical verbs is in last place, except where it combines with the auxiliary verb:

- Nas ni nihče vprašal. (Noone asked us.)(lit. Noone has not asked us.)
- Ne bi ga rad srečal. (I would not like to meet him.)
- Bolje je ne delati kot delati škodo. (It is better not to work than to do (lit. work) harm.)
- Delal nisem nič manj kot drugi. (I have not worked any less than others.)

=== Passive & reflexive voice ===
The passive voice is formed using the passive past participle of the verb and auxiliary verbs. Reflexive voice is formed by turning a verb into a reflexive verb, by adding the reflexive pronoun se to the verb. Passive and reflexive voice is formed as shown in this table:

Formation of passive and reflexive voice
	Passive voice		Reflexive voice	
	Formation	Example	Formation	Example
Long infinitive	biti + passive participle	biti delan	se + long infinitive	se delati
Short infinitive	bit + passive participle	bit delan	se + short infinitive	se delat
Supine	(bit + passive participle)	(bit zabavan)	se + supine	se delat
Present indicative	present indicative of biti + passive participle	je delan	se + present indicative	se dela
Future indicative	future indicative of biti + passive participle	bom delan	se + future indicative of biti + l-participle	se bo delal
Preterite indicative	present indicative of biti + bil + passive participle	je bil delan	se + present indicative of biti + l-participle	se je delal
Pluperfect indicative	/		se + present indicative of biti + bil + l-participle	se je bil delal
Imperative	imperative of biti + passive participle	bodi delan	imperative + se	delaj se
Hortative & Optative	naj + the way it is formed in the wanted tense	naj bo delan	naj + the way it is formed in the wanted tense	naj se bo delal
Present conditional	bi bil + passive participle	bi bil narejen	bi + se + l-participle	bi se delal
Past conditional	/		bi + se + bil + l-participle	bi se bil delal
Future conditional	/		(future indicative of biti + se + bil + l-participle)	(bom se bil delal)
Č-paticiple	/		č-participle + se	delajoč se
E-participle	/		(e-participle + se)	(delaje se)
L-participle	/		(l-participle + se)	(obrasel se)
Š-participle	/		(š-participle + se)	(izdelavši se)
Passive participle	/		(n-participle + se)	(delan se)
Gerund	/		(gerund + se)	(delanje se)
Negative	(naj) + ne + the rest	naj ne bo delan ni delan	(naj) (se) + ne + the rest	naj se ne bi delal ne delaj se

An example of the passive voice is:

- Izvoljen je bil za člana Kraljeve družbe (He was elected a fellow of the Royal Society).

However, this is more commonly stated using the active voice with an impersonal form of the third person plural (like English "impersonal they"):

- Izvolili so ga za člana Kraljeve družbe (They elected him a fellow of the Royal Society).

== Full conjugation of a regular verb ==
The following table presents full conjugation of a regular verb dẹ́lati:

Class V: -a-ti, -a-m, accent paradigm I
		Singular			Dual			Plural		
		1st	2nd	3rd	1st	2nd	3rd	1st	2nd	3rd
Present indicative		dẹ̑lam	dẹ̑laš	dẹ̑la	dẹ̑lava	dẹ̑lata	dẹ̑lata	dẹ̑lamo	dẹ̑late	dẹ̑lajo
Preterite indicative	m.	sem dẹ́lał	si dẹ́lał	je dẹ́lał	sva dẹ́lala	sta dẹ́lala	sta dẹ́lala	smo dẹ́lali	ste dẹ́lali	so dẹ́lali
Preterite indicative	f.	sem dẹ̄lala	si dẹ̄lala	je dẹ̄lala	sva dẹ́lali	sta dẹ́lali	sta dẹ́lali	smo dẹ́lale	ste dẹ́lale	so dẹ́lale
Preterite indicative	n.	sem dẹ́lalo	si dẹ́lalo	je dẹ́lalo	sva dẹ́lali	sta dẹ́lali	sta dẹ́lali	smo dẹ́lala	ste dẹ́lala	so dẹ́lala
Future indicative	m.	bom dẹ́lał bodem dẹ́lał (họ́čem dẹ́lati)	boš dẹ́lał bodeš dẹ́lał (họ́češ dẹ́lati)	bo dẹ́lał bode dẹ̑lał (họ́če dẹ́lati)	bova dẹ́lala bodeva dẹ́lala (họ́čeva dẹ́lati)	bosta dẹ́lala bodeta dẹ́lala bota dẹ́lala (họ́četa dẹ́lati)	bosta dẹ́lala bodeta dẹ́lala bota dẹ́lala (họ́četa dẹ́lati)	bomo dẹ́lali bodemo dẹ́lali (họ́čemo dẹ́lati)	boste dẹ́lali bodete dẹ́lali bote dẹ̑lali (họ́čete dẹ́lati)	bodo dẹ́lali bojo dẹ́lali bodete dẹ́lali (họ́čejo dẹ́lati)
Future indicative	f.	bom dẹ̄lala bodem dẹ̄lala (họ́čem dẹ́lati)	boš dẹ̄lala bodeš dẹ̄lala (họ́češ dẹ́lati)	bo dẹ̄lala bode dẹ̄lala (họ́če dẹ́lati)	bova dẹ́lali bodeva dẹ́lali (họ́čeva dẹ́lati)	bosta dẹ́lali bodeta dẹ́lali bota dẹ́lali (họ́četa dẹ́lati)	bosta dẹ́lali bodeta dẹ́lali bota dẹ́lali (họ́četa dẹ́lati)	bomo dẹ́lale bodemo dẹ́lale (họ́čemo dẹ́lati)	boste dẹ́lale bodete dẹ́lale bote dẹ́lale (họ́čete dẹ́lati)	bodo dẹ́lale bojo dẹ́lale bodejo dẹ́lale (họ́čejo dẹ́lati)
Future indicative	n.	bom dẹ́lalo bodem dẹ́lalo (imȃm dẹ́lati) (je dẹ́lati) (họ́čem dẹ́lati)	boš dẹ́lalo bodeš dẹ́lalo (imȃm dẹ́lati) (je dẹ́lati) (họ́čem dẹ́lati)	bo dẹ́lalo bode dẹ́lalo (imȃ dẹ́lati) (je dẹ́lati) (họ́če dẹ́lati)	bova dẹ́lali bodeva dẹ́lali (imȃva dẹ́lati) (je dẹ́lati) (họ́čeva dẹ́lati)	bosta dẹ́lali bodeta dẹ́lali bota dẹ́lali(imȃta dẹ́lati) (je dẹ́lati) (họ́četa dẹ́lati)	bosta dẹ́lali bodeta dẹ́lali bota dẹ́lali(imȃta dẹ́lati) (je dẹ́lati) (họ́četa dẹ́lati)	bomo dẹ́lala bodemo dẹ́lala (imȃmo dẹ́lati) (je dẹ́lati) (họ́čemo dẹ́lati)	boste dẹ́lala bodete dẹ́lala bote dẹ́lala(imȃte dẹ́lati) (je dẹ́lati) (họ́čete dẹ́lati)	bodo dẹ́lala bojo dẹ́lala bodejo dẹ́lala(imȃjo dẹ́lati) (je dẹ́lati) (họ́čejo dẹ́lati)
Pluperfect indicative	m.	sem bȉł dẹ́lał	si bȉł dẹ́lał	je bȉł dẹ́lał	sva bilȁ dẹ́lala sva bȋla dẹ́lala	sta bilȁ dẹ́lala sta bȋla dẹ́lala	sta bilȁ dẹ́lala sta bȋla dẹ́lala	smo bilȋ dẹ́lali smo bilȉ dẹ́lali smo bȋli dẹ́lali	ste bilȋ dẹ́lali ste bilȉ dẹ́lali ste bȋli dẹ́lali	so bilȋ dẹ́lali so bilȉ dẹ́lali so bȋli dẹ́lali
Pluperfect indicative	f.	sem bilȁ dẹ̄lala sem bȋla dẹ̄lala	si bilȁ dẹ̄lala si bȋla dẹ̄lala	je bilȁ dẹ̄lala je bȋla dẹ̄lala	sva bilȉ dẹ́lali sva bȋli dẹ́lali	sta bilȉ dẹ́lali sta bȋli dẹ́lali	sta bilȉ dẹ́lali sta bȋli dẹ́lali	smo bilȅ dẹ́lale smo bilẹ̑ dẹ́lale smo bȋle dẹ́lale	ste bilȅ dẹ́lale ste bilẹ̑ dẹ́lale ste bȋle dẹ́lale	so bilȅ dẹ́lale so bilẹ̑ dẹ́lale so bȋle dẹ́lale
Pluperfect indicative	n.	sem bilọ̑ dẹ́lalo sem bilȍ dẹ́lalo sem bȋlo dẹ́lalo	si bilọ̑ dẹ́lalo si bilȍ dẹ́lalo si bȋlo dẹ́lalo	je bilọ̑ dẹ́lalo je bilȍ dẹ́lalo je bȋlo dẹ́lalo	sva bilȉ dẹ́lali sva bȋli dẹ́lali	sta bilȉ dẹ́lali sta bȋli dẹ́lali	sta bilȉ dẹ́lali sta bȋli dẹ́lali	smo bilȁ dẹ́lala smo bȋla dẹ́lala	ste bilȁ dẹ́lala ste bȋla dẹ́lala	so bilȁ dẹ́lala so bȋla dẹ́lala
Imperative		dẹ́laj	dẹ́laj	dẹ́laj	dẹ́lajva	dẹ́lajta	dẹ́lajta	dẹ́lajmo	dẹ́lajte	–
Present conditional	m.	bi dẹ́lał	bi dẹ́lał	bi dẹ́lał	bi dẹ́lala	bi dẹ́lala	bi dẹ́lala	bi dẹ́lali	bi dẹ́lali	bi dẹ́lali
Present conditional	f.	bi dẹ̄lala	bi dẹ̄lala	bi dẹ̄lala	bi dẹ́lali	bi dẹ́lali	bi dẹ́lali	bi dẹ́lale	bi dẹ́lale	bi dẹ́lale
Present conditional	n.	bi dẹ́lalo	bi dẹ́lalo	bi dẹ́lalo	bi dẹ́lali	bi dẹ́lali	bi dẹ́lali	bi dẹ́lala	bi dẹ́lala	bi dẹ́lala
Preterite conditional	m.	bi bȉł dẹ́lał	bi bȉł dẹ́lał	bi bȉł dẹ́lał	bi bilȁ dẹ́lala bi bȋla dẹ́lala	bi bilȁ dẹ́lala bi bȋla dẹ́lala	bi bilȁ dẹ́lala bi bȋla dẹ́lala	bi bilȋ dẹ́lali bi bilȉ dẹ́lali bi bȋli dẹ́lali	bi bilȋ dẹ́lali bi bilȉ dẹ́lali bi bȋli dẹ́lali	bi bilȋ dẹ́lali bi bilȉ dẹ́lali bi bȋli dẹ́lali
Preterite conditional	f.	bi bilȁ dẹ̄lala bi bȋla dẹ̄lala	bi bilȁ dẹ̄lala bi bȋla dẹ̄lala	bi bilȁ dẹ̄lala bi bȋla dẹ̄lala	bi bilȉ dẹ́lali bi bȋli dẹ́lali	bi bilȉ dẹ́lali bi bȋli dẹ́lali	bi bilȉ dẹ́lali bi bȋli dẹ́lali	bi bilȅ dẹ́lale bi bilẹ̑ dẹ́lale bi bȋle dẹ́lale	bi bilȅ dẹ́lale bi bilẹ̑ dẹ́lale bi bȋle dẹ́lale	bi bilȅ dẹ́lale bi bilẹ̑ dẹ́lale bi bȋle dẹ́lale
Preterite conditional	n.	bi bilọ̑ dẹ́lalo bi bilȍ dẹ́lalo bi bȋlo dẹ́lalo	bi bilọ̑ dẹ́lalo bi bilȍ dẹ́lalo bi bȋlo dẹ́lalo	bi bilọ̑ dẹ́lalo bi bilȍ dẹ́lalo bi bȋlo dẹ́lalo	bi bilȉ dẹ́lali bi bȋli dẹ́lali	bi bilȉ dẹ́lali bi bȋli dẹ́lali	bi bilȉ dẹ́lali bi bȋli dẹ́lali	bi bilȁ dẹ́lala bi bȋla dẹ́lala	bi bilȁ dẹ́lala bi bȋla dẹ́lala	bi bilȁ dẹ́lala bi bȋla dẹ́lala
Future conditional	m.	(bom bȉł dẹ́lał) (bodem bȉł dẹ́lał)	(boš bȉł dẹ́lał) (bodeš bȉł dẹ́lał)	(bo bȉł dẹ́lał) (bode bȉł dẹ́lał)	(bova bilȁ dẹ́lala) (bova bȋla dẹ́lala) (bodeva bilȁ dẹ́lala) (bodeva bȋla dẹ́lala)	(bosta bilȁ dẹ́lala) (bosta bȋla dẹ́lala) (bota bilȁ dẹ́lala) (bota bȋla dẹ́lala) (bodeta bilȁ dẹ́lala) (bodeta bȋla dẹ́lala)	(bosta bilȁ dẹ́lala) (bosta bȋla dẹ́lala) (bota bilȁ dẹ́lala) (bota bȋla dẹ́lala) (bodeta bilȁ dẹ́lala) (bodeta bȋla dẹ́lala)	(bomo bilȋ dẹ́lali) (bomo bilȉ dẹ́lali) (bomo bȋli dẹ́lali) (bomo bilȋ dẹ́lali) (bodemo bilȉ dẹ́lali) (bodemo bȋli dẹ́lali)	(boste bilȋ dẹ́lali) (boste bilȉ dẹ́lali) (boste bȋli dẹ́lali) (bote bilȋ dẹ́lali) (bote bilȉ dẹ́lali) (bote bȋli dẹ́lali) (bodete bilȋ dẹ́lali) (bodete bilȉ dẹ́lali) (bodete bȋli dẹ́lali)	(bodo bilȋ dẹ́lali) (bodo bilȉ dẹ́lali) (bodo bȋli dẹ́lali) (bojo bilȋ dẹ́lali) (bojo bilȉ dẹ́lali) (bojo bȋli dẹ́lali) (bodejo bilȋ dẹ́lali) (bodejo bilȉ dẹ́lali) (bodejo bȋli dẹ́lali)
Future conditional	f.	(bom bilȁ dẹ̄lala) (bom bȋla dẹ̄lala) (bodem bilȁ dẹ̄lala) (bodem bȋla dẹ̄lala)	(boš bilȁ dẹ̄lala) (boš bȋla dẹ̄lala) (bodeš bilȁ dẹ̄lala) (bodeš bȋla dẹ̄lala)	(bo bilȁ dẹ̄lala) (bo bȋla dẹ̄lala) (bode bilȁ dẹ̄lala) (bode bȋla dẹ̄lala)	(bova bilȉ dẹ́lali) (bova bȋli dẹ́lali) (bodeva bilȉ dẹ́lali) (bodeva bȋli dẹ́lali)	(bosta bilȉ dẹ́lali) (bosta bȋli dẹ́lali) (bota bilȉ dẹ́lali) (bota bȋli dẹ́lali) (bodeta bilȉ dẹ́lali) (bodeta bȋli dẹ́lali)	(bosta bilȉ dẹ́lali) (bosta bȋli dẹ́lali) (bota bilȉ dẹ́lali) (bota bȋli dẹ́lali) (bodeta bilȉ dẹ́lali) (bodeta bȋli dẹ́lali)	(bomo bilȅ dẹ́lale) (bomo bilẹ̑ dẹ́lale) (bomo bȋle dẹ́lale) (bodemo bilȅ dẹ́lale) (bodemo bilẹ̑ dẹ́lale) (bodemo bȋle dẹ́lale)	(boste bilȅ dẹ́lale) (boste bilẹ̑ dẹ́lale) (boste bȋle dẹ́lale) (bote bilȅ dẹ́lale) (bote bilẹ̑ dẹ́lale) (bote bȋle dẹ́lale) (bodete bilȅ dẹ́lale) (bodete bilẹ̑ dẹ́lale) (bodete bȋle dẹ́lale)	(bodo bilȅ dẹ́lale) (bodo bilẹ̑ dẹ́lale) (bodo bȋle dẹ́lale) (bojo bilȅ dẹ́lale) (bojo bilẹ̑ dẹ́lale) (bojo bȋle dẹ́lale) (bodo bilȅ dẹ́lale) (bodejo bilẹ̑ dẹ́lale) (bodejo bȋle dẹ́lale)
Future conditional	n.	(bom bilọ̑ dẹ́lalo) (bom bilȍ dẹ́lalo) (bom bȋlo dẹ́lalo) (bodem bilọ̑ dẹ́lalo) (bodem bilȍ dẹ́lalo) (bodem bȋlo dẹ́lalo)	(boš bilọ̑ dẹ́lalo) (boš bilȍ dẹ́lalo) (boš bȋlo dẹ́lalo) (bodeš bilọ̑ dẹ́lalo) (bodeš bilȍ dẹ́lalo) (bodeš bȋlo dẹ́lalo)	(bo bilọ̑ dẹ́lalo) (bo bilȍ dẹ́lalo) (bo bȋlo dẹ́lalo) (bode bilọ̑ dẹ́lalo) (bode bilȍ dẹ́lalo) (bode bȋlo dẹ́lalo)	(bova bilȉ dẹ́lali) (bova bȋli dẹ́lali) (bodeva bilȉ dẹ́lali) (bodeva bȋli dẹ́lali)	(bosta bilȉ dẹ́lali) (bosta bȋli dẹ́lali) (bota bilȉ dẹ́lali) (bota bȋli dẹ́lali) (bodeta bilȉ dẹ́lali) (bodeta bȋli dẹ́lali)	(bosta bilȉ dẹ́lali) (bosta bȋli dẹ́lali) (bota bilȉ dẹ́lali) (bota bȋli dẹ́lali) (bodeta bilȉ dẹ́lali) (bodeta bȋli dẹ́lali)	(bomo bilȁ dẹ́lala) (bomo bȋla dẹ́lala) (bodemo bilȁ dẹ́lala) (bodemo bȋla dẹ́lala)	(boste bilȁ dẹ́lala) (boste bȋla dẹ́lala) (bote bilȁ dẹ́lala) (bote bȋla dẹ́lala) (bodete bilȁ dẹ́lala) (bodete bȋla dẹ́lala)	(bodo bilȁ dẹ́lala) (bodo bȋla dẹ́lala) (bojo bilȁ dẹ́lala) (bojo bȋla dẹ́lala) (bodejo bilȁ dẹ́lala) (bodejo bȋla dẹ́lala)
Present hortative		naj dẹ̑lam	naj dẹ̑laš	naj dẹ̑la	naj dẹ̑lava	naj dẹ̑lata	naj dẹ̑lata	naj dẹ̑lamo	naj dẹ̑late	naj dẹ̑lajo
Past hortative	m.	naj sem dẹ́lał	naj si dẹ́lał	naj je dẹ́lał	naj sva dẹ́lala	naj sta dẹ́lala	naj sta dẹ́lala	naj smo dẹ́lali	naj ste dẹ́lali	naj so dẹ́lali
Past hortative	f.	naj sem dẹ̄lala	naj si dẹ̄lala	naj je dẹ̄lala	naj sva dẹ́lali	naj sta dẹ́lali	naj sta dẹ́lali	naj smo dẹ́lale	naj ste dẹ́lale	naj so dẹ́lale
Past hortative	n.	naj sem dẹ́lalo	naj si dẹ́lalo	naj je dẹ́lalo	naj sva dẹ́lali	naj sta dẹ́lali	naj sta dẹ́lali	naj smo dẹ́lala	naj ste dẹ́lala	naj so dẹ́lala
Future hortative	m.	naj bom dẹ́lał naj bodem dẹ́lał	naj boš dẹ́lał naj bodeš dẹ́lał	naj bo dẹ́lał naj bode dẹ̑lał	naj bova dẹ́lala naj bodeva dẹ́lala	naj bosta dẹ́lala naj bodeta dẹ́lala naj bota dẹ́lala	naj bosta dẹ́lala naj bodeta dẹ́lala naj bota dẹ́lala	naj bomo dẹ́lali naj bodemo dẹ́lali	naj boste dẹ́lali naj bodete dẹ́lali naj bote dẹ̑lali	naj bodo dẹ́lali naj bojo dẹ́lali naj bodete dẹ́lali
Future hortative	f.	naj bom dẹ̄lala naj bodem dẹ̄lala	naj boš dẹ̄lala naj bodeš dẹ̄lala	naj bo dẹ̄lala naj bode dẹ̄lala	naj bova dẹ́lali naj bodeva dẹ́lali	naj bosta dẹ́lali naj bodeta dẹ́lali naj bota dẹ́lali	naj bosta dẹ́lali naj bodeta dẹ́lali naj bota dẹ́lali	naj bomo dẹ́lale naj bodemo dẹ́lale	naj boste dẹ́lale naj bodete dẹ́lale naj bote dẹ́lale	naj bodo dẹ́lale naj bojo dẹ́lale naj bodejo dẹ́lale
Future hortative	n.	naj bom dẹ́lalo naj bodem dẹ́lalo	naj boš dẹ́lalo naj bodeš dẹ́lalo	naj bo dẹ́lalo naj bode dẹ́lalo	naj bova dẹ́lali naj bodeva dẹ́lali	naj bosta dẹ́lali naj bodeta dẹ́lali naj bota dẹ́lali	naj bosta dẹ́lali naj bodeta dẹ́lali naj bota dẹ́lali	naj bomo dẹ́lala naj bodemo dẹ́lala	naj boste dẹ́lala naj bodete dẹ́lala naj bote dẹ́lala	naj bodo dẹ́lala naj bojo dẹ́lala naj bodejo dẹ́lala
Pluperfect hortative	m.	naj sem bȉł dẹ́lał	naj si bȉł dẹ́lał	naj je bȉł dẹ́lał	naj sva bilȁ dẹ́lala naj sva bȋla dẹ́lala	naj sta bilȁ dẹ́lala naj sta bȋla dẹ́lala	naj sta bilȁ dẹ́lala naj sta bȋla dẹ́lala	naj smo bilȋ dẹ́lali naj smo bilȉ dẹ́lali naj smo bȋli dẹ́lali	naj ste bilȋ dẹ́lali naj ste bilȉ dẹ́lali naj ste bȋli dẹ́lali	naj so bilȋ dẹ́lali naj so bilȉ dẹ́lali naj so bȋli dẹ́lali
Pluperfect hortative	f.	naj sem bilȁ dẹ̄lala naj sem bȋla dẹ̄lala	naj si bilȁ dẹ̄lala naj si bȋla dẹ̄lala	naj je bilȁ dẹ̄lala naj je bȋla dẹ̄lala	naj sva bilȉ dẹ́lali naj sva bȋli dẹ́lali	naj sta bilȉ dẹ́lali naj sta bȋli dẹ́lali	naj sta bilȉ dẹ́lali naj sta bȋli dẹ́lali	naj smo bilȅ dẹ́lale naj smo bilẹ̑ dẹ́lale naj smo bȋle dẹ́lale	naj ste bilȅ dẹ́lale naj ste bilẹ̑ dẹ́lale naj ste bȋle dẹ́lale	naj so bilȅ dẹ́lale naj so bilẹ̑ dẹ́lale naj so bȋle dẹ́lale
Pluperfect hortative	n.	naj sem bilọ̑ dẹ́lalo naj sem bilȍ dẹ́lalo naj sem bȋlo dẹ́lalo	naj si bilọ̑ dẹ́lalo naj si bilȍ dẹ́lalo naj si bȋlo dẹ́lalo	naj je bilọ̑ dẹ́lalo naj je bilȍ dẹ́lalo naj je bȋlo dẹ́lalo	naj sva bilȉ dẹ́lali naj sva bȋli dẹ́lali	naj sta bilȉ dẹ́lali naj sta bȋli dẹ́lali	naj sta bilȉ dẹ́lali naj sta bȋli dẹ́lali	naj smo bilȁ dẹ́lala naj smo bȋla dẹ́lala	naj ste bilȁ dẹ́lala naj ste bȋla dẹ́lala	naj so bilȁ dẹ́lala naj so bȋla dẹ́lala
Present optative	m.	naj bi dẹ́lał	naj bi dẹ́lał	naj bi dẹ́lał	naj bi dẹ́lala	naj bi dẹ́lala	naj bi dẹ́lala	naj bi dẹ́lali	naj bi dẹ́lali	naj bi dẹ́lali
Present optative	f.	naj bi dẹ̄lala	naj bi dẹ̄lala	naj bi dẹ̄lala	naj bi dẹ́lali	naj bi dẹ́lali	naj bi dẹ́lali	naj bi dẹ́lale	naj bi dẹ́lale	naj bi dẹ́lale
Present optative	n.	naj bi dẹ́lalo	naj bi dẹ́lalo	naj bi dẹ́lalo	naj bi dẹ́lali	naj bi dẹ́lali	naj bi dẹ́lali	naj bi dẹ́lala	naj bi dẹ́lala	naj bi dẹ́lala
Past optative	m.	naj bi bȉł dẹ́lał	naj bi bȉł dẹ́lał	naj bi bȉł dẹ́lał	naj bi bilȁ dẹ́lala naj bi bȋla dẹ́lala	naj bi bilȁ dẹ́lala naj bi bȋla dẹ́lala	naj bi bilȁ dẹ́lala naj bi bȋla dẹ́lala	naj bi bilȋ dẹ́lali naj bi bilȉ dẹ́lali naj bi bȋli dẹ́lali	naj bi bilȋ dẹ́lali naj bi bilȉ dẹ́lali naj bi bȋli dẹ́lali	naj bi bilȋ dẹ́lali naj bi bilȉ dẹ́lali naj bi bȋli dẹ́lali
Past optative	f.	naj bi bilȁ dẹ̄lala naj bi bȋla dẹ̄lala	naj bi bilȁ dẹ̄lala naj bi bȋla dẹ̄lala	naj bi bilȁ dẹ̄lala naj bi bȋla dẹ̄lala	naj bi bilȉ dẹ́lali naj bi bȋli dẹ́lali	naj bi bilȉ dẹ́lali naj bi bȋli dẹ́lali	naj bi bilȉ dẹ́lali naj bi bȋli dẹ́lali	naj bi bilȅ dẹ́lale naj bi bilẹ̑ dẹ́lale naj bi bȋle dẹ́lale	naj bi bilȅ dẹ́lale naj bi bilẹ̑ dẹ́lale naj bi bȋle dẹ́lale	naj bi bilȅ dẹ́lale naj bi bilẹ̑ dẹ́lale naj bi bȋle dẹ́lale
Past optative	n.	naj bi bilọ̑ dẹ́lalo naj bi bilȍ dẹ́lalo naj bi bȋlo dẹ́lalo	naj bi bilọ̑ dẹ́lalo naj bi bilȍ dẹ́lalo naj bi bȋlo dẹ́lalo	naj bi bilọ̑ dẹ́lalo naj bi bilȍ dẹ́lalo naj bi bȋlo dẹ́lalo	naj bi bilȉ dẹ́lali naj bi bȋli dẹ́lali	naj bi bilȉ dẹ́lali naj bi bȋli dẹ́lali	naj bi bilȉ dẹ́lali naj bi bȋli dẹ́lali	naj bi bilȁ dẹ́lala naj bi bȋla dẹ́lala	naj bi bilȁ dẹ́lala naj bi bȋla dẹ́lala	naj bi bilȁ dẹ́lala naj bi bȋla dẹ́lala
Infinitive	Long	dẹ́lati								
Infinitive	Short	dẹ́lat								
Supine		dẹ́lat								
True gerund		dẹ́lanje								
Objectified gerund		–								
Č-participle	m.	delajọ̄č delajȍč			delajọ́ča			delajọ́či		
Č-participle	f.	delajọ́ča			delajọ́či			delajọ́če		
Č-participle	n.	delajọ́če			delajọ́či			delajọ́ča		
Č-participle	adv.	delajọ́č								
E-participle	adv.	delȃje								
L-participle	m.	dẹ́lal			dẹ́lala			dẹ́lali		
L-participle	f.	dẹ̄lala			dẹ́lali			dẹ́lale		
L-participle	n.	dẹ́lalo			dẹ́lali			dẹ́lala		
Š-participle	m.	–			–			–		
Š-participle	f.	–			–			–		
Š-participle	n.	–			–			–		
Š-participle	adv.	–			–			–		
N-participle	m.	dẹ̑lan			dẹ̑lana			dẹ̑lani		
N-participle	f.	dẹ̑lana			dẹ̑lani			dẹ̑lane		
N-participle	n.	dẹ̑lano			dẹ̑lani			dẹ̑lana		
