= Circumstantial =

Circumstantial may refer to:

- Circumstantial evidence, in law
- Circumstantial thinking, in psychiatry and psychopathology
- Circumstantial voice, in linguistics

== See also ==
- Circumstance (disambiguation)
