= Circumstance =

Circumstance or circumstances may refer to:

== Law ==
- Attendant circumstance, a legal concept which Black's Law Dictionary defines as the "facts surrounding an event"
  - Aggravating circumstance, a circumstance attending the commission of a crime which increases its enormity or adds to its consequences
  - Exigent circumstance, allowing law enforcement to enter a structure outside the bounds of a search warrant
  - Extenuating circumstances, information regarding a defendant or crime that might result in reduced charges or a lesser sentence

== Arts and media ==
=== Films ===
- Circumstance (2011 film), a 2011 dramatic film written and directed by Maryam Keshavarz
- Circumstance (1922 film), a 1922 Australian silent film directed by Lawson Harris

=== Literature ===
- "Circumstance" (short story), an allegorical short story by Harriet Elizabeth Prescott Spofford
- Circumstance, a 1935 novel by William M. John

=== Music ===
- Pomp and Circumstance Marches, a series of marches for orchestra composed by Sir Edward Elgar
- "Circumstances" (song), a 1978 song by the Canadian band Rush

== Other uses ==
- Circumstances (rhetoric), questions whose answers are considered basic in information gathering or problem solving

== See also ==
- Circumstantial (disambiguation)
- Community of circumstance, a group of people who share a position, circumstance, or life experiences
