= Adjutative voice =

The adjutative voice is a grammatical voice carrying the meaning "to help to". The subject of a verb in the adjutative voice is not an agent of the action denoted by the verb, but assists the (unstated) agent in performing the action.

== Xamtanga language ==
For example, in the Xamtanga language, the adjutative voice is formed by total reduplication of the verbal stem, insertion of the linking vowel [-ə], and the suffixation of the causative suffix [-s] to the verbal stems.

"adəruØ guləʃət lɨwəʃən dʒɨβə dʒɨβɨsØu." Aderu helped Guleshe to buy the cow.
