= William M. John =

American writer

- Born: William Mestrezat John; 1888; Trinidad, Colorado, United States
- Died: 1962 (aged 73–74); Los Angeles, California, United States
- Education: Princeton University

William Mestrezat John (1888 – 1962) was an American rancher, short story writer, and novelist.

== Early life ==
John was born in Trinidad, Colorado. He attended Princeton University and graduated in 1910. Among this graduating class, he was one of only six students heralding from west of the Mississippi River.

== Career ==
Later in life, John would return to Colorado, continuing his life as a rancher and farmer. He took up writing, fictionalizing individuals he witnessed in life. Many of his works were set in the fictional Tumbleweed Valley. It is believed that this location may have been based on the "Sunflower Valley" in Las Animas County, Colorado.

His first novel, 1929's Seven Women, garnered critical praise from The New York Times. The Saturday Review praised the book's overall quality, saying the writing was impressive for a debut novel, but they also criticized the characters for being one dimensional. The Bookman's brief review somewhat contradicts The Saturday Review, suggesting John successfully justified the ruthless characters, giving readers insight into each woman's worldview. The Philadelphia Inquirer, in a critical notice of Every Wise Woman (1931), described Seven Women as "psychologically acute".

Mere months after his debut novel appeared as a best-seller, his short story "Neither Jew nor Greek" won him an O. Henry Award in 1930, tying with W. R. Burnett's short story, "Dressing Up." The two authors shared equally the $500 prize money. John's second novel, Every Wise Woman (1931), received criticism from The Saturday Review, which described the novel as blunt, monotonous, and less effective than John's previous book. However, John's novel Mingled Yarn (1933) received praise from The Denver Post, with columnist Caroline Bancroft saying, "[John is] fast becoming that of a first-rate humorist in that homely American tradition of which Mark Twain is its outstanding example."

In 1931, John would become an elected officer to the newly formed Colorado Author's League. However, following a non-fatal heart attack, John's writing career effectively concluded in the early 1940s.

== Literary works ==
=== Novels ===
- Seven Women (1929)
- Every Wise Woman (1931)
- Mingled Yarn (1933)
- Circumstance (1935)

=== Short stories ===
- "Through Hell," The Century Magazine (September 1926)
- "In the Interests of Light and Learnin'," The Century Magazine (September 1927)
- "Tilly Tells the Story," The Century Magazine (December 1927)
- "Love Germ," The Century Magazine (February 1928)
- "Miss Pansy's Pansies," The Century Magazine (July 1928)
- "Concernin' Names," The Century Magazine (September 1928)
- "That Passeth Understandin'," The Century Magazine (February 1929)
- "Vieve's Man," The Century Magazine (April 1929)
- "Neither Jew Nor Greek," The Century Magazine (August 1929)
- "After All I've Done," Ladies' Home Journal (September 1930)
- "I-and-My," Ladies' Home Journal (April 1931)
- "Emma and Frank," Scribner's Magazine (December 1937)

== Literary awards ==
- O. Henry Award, first prize, 1930, for "Neither Jew nor Greek". Tied for first place with W. R. Burnett.

== Scholarship foundation ==
John started a scholarship in honor of his sister, Mary John Goree, who died in 1944. Established in 1947 (only taking effect in 1962 after John's death), The Princeton Goree Scholarship is offered to Las Animas County, Colorado students looking to attend Princeton.

In 2014, the foundation overseeing the scholarship (the Mary John Goree Las Animas County Scholarship Foundation) created a second scholarship called the Las Animas Goree Scholarship, an award offered to students looking to attend colleges other than Princeton.
