= Circumstantial voice =

In grammar, a circumstantial voice, or circumstantial passive voice, is a voice that promotes an oblique argument of a verb to the role of subject; the underlying subject may then be expressed as an oblique argument. A given language may have several circumstantial voices, each promoting a different oblique argument.

Circumstantials are conceptually similar to applicatives, which promote obliques to direct objects. However, applicatives may increase the valency of an intransitive verb by adding a direct object, while circumstantials cannot. They also resemble the passive voice, which promotes a patient to the subject position, but circumstantials instead promote oblique arguments, which generally bear other semantic roles.

Circumstantials are found in Malagasy, as well as Toba Batak.

== See also ==
- Symmetrical voice
