= İstiklal (disambiguation) =

İstiklal (lit. 'independence') is a national Turkish newspaper.

İstiklal may also refer to:

- İstiklal, Buharkent, neighbourhood in district of Buharkent, Aydın Province, Turkey
- İstiklal, Seyhan, a neighborhood in Adana, Turkey
- İstiklal Avenue, a major pedestrian shopping street in Istanbul
- İstiklal Marşı, the national anthem of Turkey and Northern Cyprus
- Istiklal Mosque, Sarajevo, a mosque in Bosnia and Herzegovina

== See also ==
- Istiqlal (disambiguation)
- Esteghlal (disambiguation)
