= Arabic verbs =

Verbs in the Arabic language

Arabic verbs (فِعْل fiʿl; pl. أَفْعَال afʿāl), like the verbs in other Semitic languages, and the entire vocabulary in those languages, are based on a set of two to five (but usually three) consonants called a root (triliteral or quadriliteral according to the number of consonants). The root communicates the basic meaning of the verb, e.g. ك-ت-ب k-t-b 'write', ق-ر-ء q-r-ʾ 'read', ء-ك-ل ʾ-k-l 'eat'. Changes to the vowels in between the consonants, along with prefixes or suffixes, specify grammatical functions such as person, gender, number, tense, mood, and voice.

Various categories are marked on verbs:

- Three tenses (present, past; future tense is indicated by the prefix sa- or the particle sawfa and the present tense).
- Two voices (active, passive)
- Two genders (masculine, feminine)
- Three persons (first, second, third)
- Three numbers (singular, dual, plural)
- Six moods in the non-past only (indicative, subjunctive, jussive, imperative, and short and long energetics)
- Nineteen forms, the derivational systems indicating derivative concepts such as intensive, causative, reciprocal, reflexive, frequentative etc. For each form, there is also an active and a passive participle (both adjectives, declined through the full paradigm of gender, number, case and state) and a verbal noun (declined for case; also, when lexicalized, may be declined for number).

Weakness is an inherent property of a given verb determined by the particular consonants of the verb root (corresponding to a verb conjugation in Classical Latin and other European languages), with five main types of weakness and two or three subtypes of each type.

Arabic grammarians typically use the root ف-ع-ل f-ʿ-l to indicate the particular shape of any given element of a verbal paradigm. As an example, the form يتكاتب (root: ك-ت-ب) yutakātabu 'he is corresponded (with)' would be listed generically as يتفاعل yutafāʿalu (yuta1ā2a3u), specifying the generic shape of a strong Form VI passive verb, third-person masculine singular present indicative.

The maximum possible total number of verb forms derivable from a root — not counting participles and verbal nouns — is approximately 13 person/number/gender forms; times 9 tense/mood combinations, counting the س- sa- future (since the moods are active only in the present tense, and the imperative has only 5 of the 13 paradigmatic forms); times 17 form/voice combinations (since forms IX, XI–XV exist only for a small number of stative roots, and form VII cannot normally form a passive), for a total of 1,989. Each of these has its own stem form, and each of these stem forms itself comes in numerous varieties, according to the weakness (or lack thereof) of the underlying root.

== Inflectional categories ==
Each particular lexical verb is specified by four stems, two each for the active and passive voices. In a particular voice, one stem (the perfective stem) is usually used for the past tense, and the other (the imperfective stem) is usually used for the present and future tenses, along with non-indicative moods, e.g. subjunctive and imperative. Though there is still some disagreement about the interpretation of the stems as tense or aspect, the dominant current view is that the stems represent aspect, sometimes of a relative rather than absolute nature. In this system of classification, the ostensibly "past" and "non-past" stems are called the perfective stem and imperfective stem.

To the past stem, suffixes are added to mark the verb for person, number and gender, while to the non-past stem, a combination of prefixes and suffixes are added. (Very approximately, the prefixes specify the person and the suffixes indicate number and gender.) A total of 13 forms exist for each of the two stems, specifying person (first, second or third); number (singular, dual or plural); and gender (masculine or feminine).

There are six separate moods in the non-past: indicative, imperative, subjunctive, jussive, short energetic and long energetic. The moods are generally marked by suffixes. When no number suffix is present, the endings are -u for indicative, -a for subjunctive, no ending for imperative and jussive, ـَنْ -an for shorter energetic, ـَنَّ -anna for longer energetic. When number suffixes are present, the moods are either distinguished by different forms of the suffixes (e.g. ـُونَ -ūna for masculine plural indicative vs. ـُو -ū for masculine plural subjunctive/imperative/jussive), or not distinguished at all. The imperative exists only in the second person and is distinguished from the jussive by the lack of the normal second-person prefix ـت ta-/tu-.

The third person masculine singular past tense form serves as the "dictionary form" used to identify a verb, similar to the infinitive in English. (Arabic has no infinitive.) For example, the verb meaning 'write' is often specified as كَتَبَ kataba, which actually means 'he wrote'. This indicates that the past-tense stem is كَتَبْـ katab-; the corresponding non-past stem is ـكْتُبْـ -ktub-, as in يَكْتُبُ yaktubu 'he writes'. Using the third person masculine singular as the dictionary citation form is more useful in that the vowels that appear in the remaining present tense forms are evident. Especially in form I verbs, without prior knowledge, these vowels are often not evident based purely on the past-tense forms.

=== Tense ===
There are three tenses in Arabic: the past tense (اَلْمَاضِي al-māḍī), the present tense (اَلْمُضَارِع al-muḍāriʿ) and the future tense. The future tense in Classical Arabic is formed by adding either the prefix سَـ sa- or the separate word سَوْفَ sawfa onto the beginning of the present tense verb, e.g. سَيَكْتُبُ sa-yaktubu or سَوْفَ يَكْتُبُ sawfa yaktubu 'he will write'.

In some contexts, the tenses represent aspectual distinctions rather than tense distinctions. The usage of Arabic tenses is as follows:

- The past tense often (but not always) specifically has the meaning of a past perfective, i.e. it expresses the concept of 'he did' as opposed to 'he was doing'. The latter can be expressed using the combination of the past tense of the verb كَانَ kāna 'to be' with the present tense or active participle, e.g. كَانَ يَكْتُبُ kāna yaktubu or كَانَ كَاتِبًا kāna kātiban 'he was writing'. There are some special verbs known as "compound verbs" that can express many grammatical aspects such as Inchoative, Durative etc., for example بَدَأ يُلْفِتُ النَظرَ badaʾa yulfitu al-naẓara means "he started to attract attention" which badaʾa conveys the meaning of "to start doing something (in the past)"
- The two tenses can be used to express relative tense (or in an alternative view, grammatical aspect) when following other verbs in a serial verb construction. In such a construction, the present tense indicates time simultaneous with the main verb, while the past tense indicates time prior to the main verb. (Or alternatively, the present tense indicates the imperfective aspect while the past tense indicates the perfective aspect.)

In all but Form I, there is only one possible shape for each of the past and non-past stems for a given root. In Form I, however, different verbs have different shapes. Examples:

- كَتَبَ يَكْتُبُ kataba yaktubu 'write'
- كَسَبَ يَكْسِبُ kasaba yaksibu 'earn'
- قَرَأَ يَقْرَأُ qaraʾa yaqraʾu 'read'
- قَدِمَ يَقْدَمُ qadima yaqdamu 'turn'
- كَبُرَ يَكْبُرُ kabura yakburu 'become big, grow up'

Notice that the second vowel can be any of a i u in both past and non-past stems. The vowel a occurs in most past stems, while i occurs in some (especially intransitive) and u occurs only in a few stative verbs (i.e. whose meaning is 'be X' or 'become X' where X is an adjective). The most common patterns are:

- past: a; non-past: u or i
- past: a, non-past: a (when the second or third root consonant is a "guttural," i.e. one of ʾ ʿ h ḥ)
- past: i; non-past: a
- past: u; non-past: u

=== Mood ===
There are three moods (حَالَات ḥālāt, a word that also means "cases"; sg. حَالَة ḥālah), whose forms are derived from the imperfective stem: the indicative mood (مَرْفُوع marfūʿ), usually ending in u; the subjunctive (مَنْصُوب manṣūb), usually ending in a; and the jussive (مَجْزُوم majzūm), with no ending. In less formal Arabic and in spoken dialects, the subjunctive mood is used as the only imperfective tense (subjunctivism) and the final ḥarakah vowel is not pronounced.

The imperative (صِيغَة اَلْأَمْر ṣīghat al-amr) (positive, only 2nd person) is formed by dropping the verbal prefix (ت-) from the imperfective jussive stem, e.g. قَدِّم qaddim 'present!'. If the result starts with two consonants followed by a vowel (a or i), an elidible alif (ا) is added to the beginning of the word, usually pronounced as "i", e.g. اِغْسِلْ ighsil 'wash!' or اِفْعَلْ ifʿal 'do!' if the present form vowel is u, then the alif is also pronounced as u, e.g. اُكْتُبْ uktub 'write!'. Negative imperatives are formed from the jussive.

The exception to the above rule is the form (or stem) IV verbs. In these verbs a non-elidible alif ا pronounced as a- is always prefixed to the imperfect jussive form, e.g. أَرْسِلْ arsil "send!", أَضِفْ aḍif 'add!'.

The subjunctive is used in subordinate clauses after certain conjunctions. The jussive is used in negation, in negative imperatives, and in the hortative la+jussive. For example: 2. sg. m.:

- imperfect indicative تَفْعَلُ tafʿalu 'you are doing'
- subjunctive أن تَفْعَلَ an tafʿala 'that you do'
- jussive لا تَفْعَلْ lā tafʿal its meaning is dependent upon the prefix which attaches to it; in this case, it means 'may you do not do!'
- short energetic تَفْعَلَنْ tafʿalan its meaning is dependent upon the prefix which attaches to it; if the prefix is "la" it means 'you should do'
- long energetic تَفْعَلَنَّ tafʿalanna it has more emphasis than the short energetic, its meaning is dependent upon the prefix which attaches to it; if the prefix is "la" it means 'you must do'
- imperative اِفْعَلْ ifʿal 'do!'.

=== Voice ===
Arabic has two verbal voices (صِيغَات ṣīghāt "forms", sg. صِيغَة ṣīghah), active (صِيغَة اَلْمَعْلُوم ṣīghat al-maʿlūm), and passive (صِيغَة اَلْمَجْهُول ṣīghat al-majhūl). The passive voice is expressed by a change in vocalization. For example:

- active فَعَلَ faʿala 'he did', يَفْعَلُ yafʿalu 'he is doing'
- passive فُعِلَ fuʿila 'it was done', يُفْعَلُ yufʿalu 'it is being done'

Thus, the active and passive forms are spelled identically in Arabic; only their vowel markings differ. There are some exceptions to this in the case of weak roots.

=== Participle ===
Every verb has a corresponding active participle, and most have passive participles. E.g. معلم muʿallim 'teacher' is the active participle to stem II. of the root ع-ل-م ʿ-l-m ('know').

- The active participle to Stem I is فَاعِل fāʿil, and the passive participle is مَفْعُول mafʿūl.
- Stems II–X take prefix مُـ mu- and nominal endings for both the participles, active and passive. The difference between the two participles is only in the vowel between the last two root letters, which is -i- for active and -a- for passive (e.g. II. active مُفَعِّل mu-faʿʿil, and passive مُفَعَّل mu-faʿʿal).

=== Verbal noun (maṣdar) ===
In addition to a participle, there is a verbal noun (in Arabic, مَصْدَر maṣdar, pl. مَصَادِر maṣādir, literally meaning 'source'), sometimes called a gerund, which is similar to English gerunds and verb-derived nouns of various sorts (e.g. "running" and "a run" from "to run"; "objection" from "to object"). As shown by the English examples, its meaning refers both to the act of doing something and (by frequent semantic extension) to its result. One of its syntactic functions is as a verbal complement of another verb, and this usage it corresponds to the English gerund or infinitive (He prevented me from running or He began to run).

- verbal noun formation to stem I is irregular.
- the verbal noun to stem II is تفعيل tafʿīl. For example: تحضير taḥḍīr 'preparation' is the verbal noun to stem II. of ح-ض-ر ḥ-ḍ-r ('to be present').
- stem III often forms its verbal noun with the feminine form of the passive participle, so for ساعد sāʿada, 'he helped', produces the verbal noun مساعدة musāʿadah. There are also some verbal nouns of the form فعال fiʿāl: جاهد jāhada, 'he strove', yields jihād جهاد 'striving' (for a cause or purpose).

Some well-known examples of verbal nouns are فتح fatḥ (see Fatah) (Form I), تنظيم tanẓīm (Form II), جهاد jihād (Form III), إسلام islām (Form IV), انتفاضة intifāḍah (feminine of Form VIII verbal noun), and استقلال istiqlāl (Form X).

== Derivational categories, conjugations ==
The system of verb conjugations in Arabic is quite complicated, and is formed along two axes. One axis, known as the form (described as "Form I", "Form II", etc.), is used to specify grammatical concepts such as causative, intensive, reciprocal, passive or reflexive, and involves varying the stem form. The other axis, known as the weakness, is determined by the particular consonants making up the root. For example, defective (or third-weak or final-weak) verbs have a و w or ي y as the last root consonant (e.g. ر-م-ي r-m-y 'throw', د-ع-و d-ʿ-w 'call'), and doubled (or geminated) verbs have the second and third consonants the same (e.g. م-د-د m-d-d 'extend'). These "weaknesses" have the effect of inducing various irregularities in the stems and endings of the associated verbs.

Examples of the different forms of a sound verb (i.e. with no root weaknesses), from the root ك-ت-ب k-t-b 'write' (using ح-م-ر ḥ-m-r 'red' for Form IX, which is limited to colors and physical defects):

Form	Past	Meaning	Non-past	Meaning
I	kataba كَتَبَ	'he wrote'	yaktubu يَكْتُبُ	'he writes'
II	kattaba كَتَّبَ	'he made (someone) write'	yukattibu يُكَتِّبُ	'he makes (someone) write'
III	kātaba كاتَبَ	'he corresponded with, wrote to (someone)'	yukātibu يُكاتِبُ	'"he corresponds with, writes to (someone)'
IV	ʾaktaba أَكْتَبَ	'he dictated'	yuktibu يُكْتِبُ	'he dictates'
V	takattaba تَكَتَّبَ	nonexistent	yatakattabu يَتَكَتُّبُ	nonexistent
VI	takātaba تَكَاتَبَ	'he corresponded (with someone, esp. mutually)'	yatakātabu يَتَكَاتَبَ	'he corresponds (with someone, esp. mutually)'
VII	inkataba اِنْكَتَبَ	'he subscribed'	yankatibu يَنْكَتِبُ	'he subscribes'
VIII	iktataba اِكْتَتَبَ	'he copied'	yaktatibu يَكْتَتِبُ	'he copies'
IX	iḥmarra اِحْمَرَّ	'he turned red'	yaḥmarru يَحْمَرُّ	'he turns red'
X	istaktaba اِسْتَكْتَبَ	'he asked (someone) to write'	yastaktibu يَسْتَكْتِبُ	'he asks (someone) to write'

The main types of weakness are as follows:

Main weakness varieties for Form I, with verbs in the active indicative
Weakness	Root	Past 3rd sg. masc.	Past 1st sg.	Present 3rd sg. masc.	Present 3pl. fem.
Sound (Non-Weak)	ك-ت-ب k-t-b 'to write'	كَتَبَ kataba	كَتَبْتُ katabtu	يَكْتُبُ yaktubu	يَكْتُبْنَ yaktubna
Assimilated (First-Weak), W	و-ج-د w-j-d 'to find'	وَجَدَ wajada	وَجَدْتُ wajadtu	يَجِدُ yajidu	يَجِدْنَ yajidna
Assimilated (First-Weak), Y	ي-ب-س y-b-s 'to dry'	يَبِسَ yabisa	يَبِسْتُ yabistu	يَيْبَسُ yaybasu	يَيْبَسْنَ yaybasna
Hollow (Second-Weak), W	ق-و-ل q-w-l 'to say'	قالَ qāla	قُلْتُ qultu	يَقُولُ yaqūlu	يَقُلْنَ yaqulna
Hollow (Second-Weak), Y	س-ي-ر s-y-r 'to travel, go'	سارَ sāra	سِرْتُ sirtu	يَسِيرُ yasīru	يَسِرْنَ yasirna
Defective (Third-Weak, final-weak), W	د-ع-و d-ʿ-w 'to call'	دَعا daʿā	دَعَوْتُ daʿawtu	يَدْعُو yadʿū	يَدْعُونَ yadʿūna
Defective (Third-Weak, final-weak), Y	ر-م-ي r-m-y 'to throw'	رَمَى ramā	رَمَيْتُ ramaytu	يَرْمِي yarmī	يَرْمِينَ yarmīna
Doubled (geminated)	م-د-د m-d-d 'to extend'	مَدَّ madda	مَدَدْتُ madadtu	يَمُدُّ yamuddu	يَمْدُدْنَ yamdudna

== Conjugation ==
=== Regular verb conjugation for person-number, tense-aspect-mood, and participles ===
In Arabic the grammatical person and number as well as the mood are designated by a variety of prefixes and suffixes. The following table shows the paradigm of a regular sound Form I verb, kataba (كتب) 'to write'. Most of the final short vowels are often omitted in speech, except the vowel of the feminine plural ending -na, and normally the vowel of the past tense second person feminine singular ending -ti.

Paradigm of a regular Form I Arabic verb, (كَتَبَ (يَكْتُبُ kataba (yaktubu) 'to write'
			Past	Present Indicative	Subjunctive	Jussive	Long Energetic	Short Energetic	Imperative
Active	Singular								
Active	1st		katab**-tu**	**a-**ktub**-u**	**a-**ktub**-a**	**a**-ktub	**a-**ktub**-anna**	**a-**ktub**-an**	–
Active	1st		كَتَبْتُ	أَكْتُبُ	أَكْتُبَ	أَكْتُبْ	أَكْتُبَنَّ	أَكْتُبَنْ	–
Active	2nd	masc.	katab**-ta**	**ta-**ktub**-u**	**ta-**ktub**-a**	**ta**-ktub	**ta-**ktub**-anna**	**ta-**ktub**-an**	**u**-ktub
Active	2nd	masc.	كَتَبْتَ	تَكْتُبُ	تَكْتُبَ	تَكْتُبْ	تَكْتُبَنَّ	تَكْتُبَنْ	اُكْتُبْ
Active	2nd	fem.	katab**-ti**	**ta-**ktub**-īna**	**ta-**ktub**-ī**		**ta-**ktub**-inna**	**ta-**ktub**-in**	**u-**ktub**-ī**
Active	2nd	fem.	كَتَبْتِ	تَكْتُبِينَ	تَكْتُبِي		تَكْتُبِنَّ	تَكْتُبِنْ	اُكْتُبِي
Active	3rd	masc.	katab**-a**	**ya-**ktub**-u**	**ya-**ktub**-a**	**ya**-ktub	**ya-**ktub**-anna**	**ya-**ktub**-an**	–
Active	3rd	masc.	كَتَبَ	يَكْتُبُ	يَكْتُبَ	يَكْتُبْ	يَكْتُبَنَّ	يَكْتُبَنْ	–
Active	3rd	fem.	katab**-at**	**ta-**ktub**-u**	**ta-**ktub**-a**	**ta-**ktub	**ta-**ktub**-anna**	**ta-**ktub**-an**	–
Active	3rd	fem.	كَتَبَتْ	تَكْتُبُ	تَكْتُبَ	تَكْتُبْ	تَكْتُبَنَّ	تَكْتُبَنْ	–
Active	Dual								
Active	2nd		katab**-tumā**	**ta-**ktub**-āni**	**ta-**ktub**-ā**		**ta-**ktub**-ānni**	–	**u-**ktub**-ā**
Active	2nd		كَتَبْتُمَا	تَكْتُبَانِ	تَكْتُبَا		تَكْتُبَانِّ	–	اُكْتُبَا
Active	3rd	masc.	katab**-ā**	**ya-**ktub**-āni**	**ya-**ktub**-ā**		**ya-**ktub**-ānni**	–	–
Active	3rd	masc.	كَتَبَا	يَكْتُبَانِ	يَكْتُبَا		يَكْتُبَانِّ	–	–
Active	3rd	fem.	katab**-atā**	**ta-**ktub**-āni**	**ta-**ktub**-ā**		**ta-**ktub**-ānni**	–	–
Active	3rd	fem.	كَتَبَتَا	تَكْتُبَانِ	تَكْتُبَا		تَكْتُبَانِّ	–	–
Active	Plural								
Active	1st		katab**-nā**	**na-**ktub**-u**	**na-**ktub**-a**	**na-**ktub	**na-**ktub**-anna**	**na-**ktub**-an**	–
Active	1st		كَتَبْنَا	نَكْتُبُ	نَكْتُبَ	نَكْتُبْ	نَكْتُبَنَّ	نَكْتُبَنْ	–
Active	2nd	masc.	katab**-tum**	**ta-**ktub**-ūna**	**ta-**ktub**-ū**		**ta-**ktub**-unna**	**ta-**ktub**-un**	**u-**ktub**-ū**
Active	2nd	masc.	كَتَبْتُمْ	تَكْتُبُونَ	تَكْتُبُوا		تَكْتُبُنَّ	تَكْتُبُنْ	اُكْتُبُوا
Active	2nd	fem.	katab**-tunna**	**ta-**ktub**-na**			**ta-**ktub**-nānni**	–	**u-**ktub**-na**
Active	2nd	fem.	كَتَبْتُنَّ	تَكْتُبْنَ			تَكْتُبْنَانِّ	–	اُكْتُبْنَ
Active	3rd	masc.	katab**-ū**	**ya-**ktub**-ūna**	**ya-**ktub**-ū**		**ya-**ktub**-unna**	**ya-**ktub**-un**	–
Active	3rd	masc.	كَتَبُوا	يَكْتُبُونَ	يَكْتُبُوا		يَكْتُبُنَّ	يَكْتُبُنْ	–
Active	3rd	fem.	katab**-na**	**ya-**ktub**-na**			**ya-**ktub**-nānni**	–	–
Active	3rd	fem.	كَتَبْنَ	يَكْتُبْنَ			يَكْتُبْنَانِّ	–	–
Passive	Singular								
Passive	1st		kutib**-tu**	**u-**ktab**-u**	**u-**ktab**-a**	**u-**ktab	**u-**ktab**-anna**	**u-**ktab**-an**	–
Passive	1st		كُتِبْتُ	أُكْتَبُ	أُكْتَبَ	أُكْتَبْ	أُكْتَبَنَّ	أُكْتَبَنْ	–
Passive	2nd	masc.	kutib**-ta**	**tu-**ktab**-u**	**tu-**ktab**-a**	**tu-**ktab	**tu-**ktab**-anna**	**tu-**ktab**-an**	–
Passive	2nd	masc.	كُتِبْتَ	تُكْتَبُ	تُكْتَبَ	تُكْتَبْ	تُكْتَبَنَّ	تُكْتَبَنْ	–
Passive	2nd	fem.	kutib**-ti**	**tu-**ktab**-īna**	**tu-**ktab**-ī**		**tu-**ktab**-inna**	**tu-**ktab**-in**	–
Passive	2nd	fem.	كُتِبْتِ	تُكْتَبِينَ	تُكْتَبِي		تُكْتَبِنَّ	تُكْتَبِنْ	–
Passive	etc.								
Nominal	Active Participle				Passive Participle			Verbal Noun	
Nominal	kātib				maktūb			katb, kitbah, kitābah	
Nominal	كَاتِب				مَكْتُوب			كَتْب، كِتْبَة، كِتَابَة	

The initial vowel in the imperative (which is elidable) varies from verb to verb, as follows:

- The initial vowel is u if the stem begins with two consonants and the next vowel is u or ū.
- The initial vowel is i if the stem begins with two consonants and the next vowel is anything else.
- There is no initial vowel if the stem begins with one consonant.

In unvocalised Arabic, katabtu, katabta, katabti and katabat are all written the same: كتبت. Forms katabtu and katabta (and sometimes even katabti) can be abbreviated to katabt in spoken Arabic and in pausa, making them also sound the same.

ا (alif) in final ـُوا (-ū) is silent.

=== Weak roots ===
Roots containing one or two of the radicals و w (wāw), ي y (yāʾ ) or ء ʾ (hamzah) often lead to verbs with special phonological rules because these radicals can be influenced by their surroundings. Such verbs are called "weak" (verba infirma, 'weak verbs') and their paradigms must be given special attention. In the case of hamzah, these peculiarities are mainly orthographical, since hamzah is not subject to elision (the orthography of ء hamzah and ا alif is unsystematic because Classical Arabic is a hybrid of Old Hejazi, the dialect in which the consonantal text was written down by the Prophet, with other dialects which showed phonetic and morphological differences). According to the position of the weak radical in the root, the root can be classified into four classes: first weak, second weak, third weak (or final weak) and doubled, where both the second and third radicals are identical. Some roots fall into more than one category at once.

==== Assimilated (first-weak) roots ====
Most first-weak verbs have a و w or ي y as their first radical. These verbs are entirely regular in the past tense. In the non-past, the w drops out if non-past uses kasra, leading to a shorter stem (e.g., (يَجِدُ) وَجَدَ wajada (yajidu) 'to find'), where the stem is ـجِدـ -jid- in place of a longer stem like ـجْلِدـ -jlid- from the verb جَلَدَ (يَجْلِدُ) jalada (yajlidu) 'to whip, flog'. This same stem is used throughout, and there are no other irregularities except for the imperative, which has no initial vowel, consistent with the fact that the stem for the imperative begins with only one consonant. If non-past employs damma, then it doesn't drop. If non-past uses fatha, it most often drops out but in some verbs it stays. It also doesn't drop out if the verb is also doubled.

There are various types of assimilated (first-weak) Form I verbs:

Past stem (3rd sg. masc.)	Non-past stem (3rd sg. masc.)	Imperative (masc. sg.)	Meaning	Sound verb parallel
وَجَدَ wajad-a	يَجِدُ yajid-u	جِدْ jid	'to find'	فَعَلَ (يَفْعِلُ) faʿala (yafʿilu)
وَرِثَ warith-a	يَرِثُ yarith-u	رِثْ rith	'to inherit'	فَعِلَ (يَفْعِلُ) faʿila (yafʿilu) [rare normally, but in assimilated verbs, rather more common than فَعِلَ (يَفْعَلُ) faʿila (yafʿalu)]
وَضَعَ waḍaʿ-a	يَضَعُ yaḍaʿ-u	ضَعْ ḍaʿ	'to put'	فَعَلَ (يَفْعَلُ) faʿala (yafʿalu)
وَجِلَ wajil-a	يَوْجَلُ yawjal-u	اِيجَلْ ījal	'to be scared'	(فَعِلَ (يَفْعَلُ faʿila (yafʿalu) (rare case where و w is preserved in non-past)
وَسُعَ wasuʿ-a	يَوْسُعُ yawsuʿ-u	اُوسُعْ ūsuʿ	'to be scared'	(فَعُلَ (يَفْعُلُ faʿula (yafʿulu)
يَسَرَ yasar-a	يَيْسِرُ yaysir-u	اِيسِرْ īsir	'to be simple'	فَعَلَ (يَفْعِلُ) faʿala (yafʿilu) (ي y is normally preserved in non-past)
يَسُرَ yasur-a	يَيْسُرُ yaysur-u	اُوسُرْ ūsur	'to be simple'	فَعُلَ (يَفْعُلُ) faʿula (yafʿulu) (ي y is normally preserved in non-past)
يَبِسَ yabis-a	يَيْبَسُ yaybas-u	اِيبَسْ ības	'to be/become dry'	فَعِلَ (يَفْعَلُ) faʿila (yafʿalu) (ي y is normally preserved in non-past)
وَدَّ (وَدِدْتُ) wadd-a (wadid-tu)	يَوَدُّ ywadd-u	اِيدَدْ īdad	'to want to; to love'	فَعِلَ (يَفْعَلُ) faʿila (yafʿalu) (also a doubled verb)
وَبَّ (وَبَبْتُ) wabb-a (wabab-tu)	يَوُبُّ ywubb-u	اُوبُبْ ūbub	'to prepare to charge; to assault in battle'	فَعَلَ (يَفْعُلُ) faʿala (yafʿulu) (also a doubled verb)
وَلِيَ waliy-a	يَلِي yalī	لِ li	'to protect'	فَعِلَ (يَفْعِلُ) faʿila (yafʿilu) (also a defective verb)

==== Hollow (second-weak) roots ====
The following shows a paradigm of a typical Form I hollow (second-weak) verb قَالَ (قُلْتُ، يَقُولُ) qāla (qultu, yaqūlu) (root: ق-و-ل q-w-l) 'to say', parallel to verbs of the فَعَلَ (يَفْعُلُ) faʿala (yafʿulu) type. See notes following the table for explanation.

Paradigm of a hollow (second-weak) Arabic verb, (قَالَ (قُلْتُ، يَقُولُ qāla (qultu, yaqūlu) 'to say'
		Past	Present Indicative	Subjunctive	Jussive	Long Energetic	Short Energetic	Imperative
Singular
1st		qul-tu	a-qūl-u	a-qūl-a	a-qul	a-qūl-anna	a-qūl-an	–
1st		قُلْتُ	أَقُولُ	أَقُولَ	أَقُلْ	أَقُولَنَّ	أَقُولَنْ	–
2nd	masc.	qul-ta	ta-qūl-u	ta-qūl-a	ta-qul	ta-qūl-anna	ta-qūl-an	qul
2nd	masc.	قُلْتَ	تَقُولُ	تَقُولَ	تَقُلْ	تَقُولَنَّ	تَقُولنْ	قُلْ
2nd	fem.	qul-ti	ta-qūl-īna	ta-qūl-ī		ta-qūl-inna	ta-qūl-in	qūl-ī
2nd	fem.	قُلْتِ	تَقُولِينَ	تَقُولِي		تَقُولِنَّ	تَقُولِنْ	قُولِي
3rd	masc.	qāl-a	ya-qūl-u	ya-qūl-a	ya-qul	ya-qūl-anna	ya-qūl-an	–
3rd	masc.	قَالَ	يَقُولُ	يَقُولَ	يَقُلْ	يَقُولَنَّ	يَقُولَنْ	–
3rd	fem.	qāl-at	ta-qūl-u	ta-qūl-a	ta-qul	ta-qūl-anna	ta-qūl-an	–
3rd	fem.	قَالَتْ	تَقُولُ	تَقُولَ	تَقُلْ	تَقُولَنَّ	تَقُولَنْ	–
Dual
2nd		qul-tumā	ta-qūl-āni	ta-qūl-ā		ta-qūl-ānni	–	qūl-ā
2nd		قُلْتُمَا	تَقُولَانِ	تَقُولَا		تَقُولَانِّ	–	قُولَا
3rd	masc.	qāl-ā	ya-qūl-āni	ya-qūl-ā		ya-qūl-ānni	–	–
3rd	masc.	قَالَا	يَقُولَانِ	يَقُولَا		يَقُولَانِّ	–	–
3rd	fem.	qāl-atā	ta-qūl-āni	ta-qūl-ā		ta-qūl-ānni	–	–
3rd	fem.	قَالَتَا	تَقُولَانِ	تَقُولَا		تَقُولَانِّ	–	–
Plural
1st		qul-nā	na-qūl-u	na-qūl-a	na-qul	na-qūl-anna	na-qūl-an	–
1st		قُلْنَا	نَقُولُ	نَقُولَ	نَقُلْ	نَقُولَنَّ	نَقُولَنْ	–
2nd	masc.	qul-tum	ta-qūl-ūna	ta-qūl-ū		ta-qūl-unna	ta-qūl-un	qūl-ū
2nd	masc.	قُلْتُمْ	تَقُولُونَ	تَقُولُوا		تَقُولُنَّ	تَقُولُنْ	قُولُوا
2nd	fem.	qul-tunna	ta-qul-na			ta-qul-nānni	–	qul-na
2nd	fem.	قُلْتُنَّ	تَقُلْنَ			تَقُلْنَانِّ	–	قُلْنَ
3rd	masc.	qāl-ū	ya-qūl-ūna	ya-qūl-ū		ya-qūl-unna	ya-qūl-un	–
3rd	masc.	قَالُوا	يَقُولُونَ	يَقُولُوا		يَقُولُنَّ	يَقُولُنْ	–
3rd	fem.	qul-na	ya-qul-na			ya-qul-nānni	–	–
3rd	fem.	قُلْنَ	يَقُلْنَ			يَقُلْنَانِّ	–	–

All hollow (second-weak) verbs are conjugated in a parallel fashion. The endings are identical to those of strong verbs, but there are two stems (a longer and a shorter) in each of the past and non-past. The longer stem is consistently used whenever the ending begins with a vowel, and the shorter stem is used in all other circumstances. The longer stems end in a long vowel plus consonant, while the shorter stems end in a short vowel plus consonant. The shorter stem is formed simply by shortening the vowel of the long stem in all paradigms other than the active past of Form I verbs. In the active past paradigms of Form I, however, the longer stem always has an ā vowel, while the shorter stem has a vowel u or i.

No initial vowel is needed in the imperative forms because the non-past stem does not begin with two consonants.

There are various types of Form I hollow verbs:

- قَالَ، قُلْنَ (يَقُولُ، يَقُلْنَ) (root: ق-و-ل) qāla, qulna (yaqūlu, yaqulna) 'to say', formed from verbs with و w as their second root consonant and parallel to verbs of the فَعَلَ (يَفْعُلُ) faʿala (yafʿulu) type
- سَارَ، سِرْنَ (يَسِيرُ، يَسِرْنَ) (root: س-ي-ر) sāra, sirna (yasīru, yasirna) 'to get going, to travel', formed from verbs with ي y as their second root consonant and parallel to verbs of the فَعَلَ (يَفْعِلُ) faʿala (yafʿilu) type
- خَافَ، خِفْنَ (يَخَافُ، يَخَفْنَ) (root: خ-و-ف) khāfa khifna (yakhāfu yakhafna) 'to fear', formed from verbs with و w as their second root consonant and parallel to verbs of the فَعِلَ (يَفْعَلُ) faʿila (yafʿalu) type
- نَالَ، نِلْنَ (يَنَالُ، يَنَلْنَ) (root: ن-ي-ل) nāla, nilna (yanālu, yanalna) 'to get', formed from verbs with ي y as their second root consonant and parallel to verbs of the فَعِلَ (يَفْعَلُ) faʿila (yafʿalu) type

The passive paradigm of almost all Form I hollow verbs is as follows:

- قِيلَ، قِلْنَ (يُقَالُ، يُقَلْنَ) qīla qilna (yuqālu yuqalna) 'to be said'

There are rare cases where Form I hollow verbs are conjugated as regular verbs because their second radical employs kasra, cancelling the long vowel formation.

- قَوِسَ، قَوِسْنَ (يَقْوَسُ، يَقْوَسْنَ) (root: ق-و-س) qawisa qawisna (yaqwasu yaqwasna) 'to form a curved shape'
- أَيِسَ، أَيِسْنَ (يَأْيِسُ، يَأْيِسْنَ) (root: ء-ي-س) ʾaisa ʾaisna (yaʾisu yaʾisna) 'to despair'

Their passives, if artificially derived at all, would also be regular, using ـُوِـ -uwi- or ـُيِـ -uyi- instead of ـِيـ -ī- in past and ـْوَـ -wa- or ـْيَـ -ya- instead of ـَاـ -ā- in non-past, without transforming the weak radical into the long vowels.

==== Defective (third-weak) roots ====
===== فَعَى (يَفْعِي) faʿā (yafʿī) =====
The following shows a paradigm of a typical Form I defective (third-weak) verb رَمَى (يَرْمِي) ramā (yarmī) (root: ر-م-ي r-m-y) 'to throw', parallel to verbs of the فَعَلَ (يَفْعِلُ) faʿala (yafʿilu) type. See notes following the table for explanation.

Paradigm of a defective (third-weak) ي y Arabic verb, (رَمَى (يَرْمِي ramā (yarmī) 'to throw'
		Past	Present Indicative	Subjunctive	Jussive	Long Energetic	Short Energetic	Imperative
Singular
1st		ramay-tu	a-**rmī**	a-rmiy-a	a-**rmi**	a-rmiy-anna	a-rmiy-an	–
1st		رَمَيْتُ	أَرْمِي	أَرْمِيَ	أَرْمِ	أَرْمِيَنَّ	ْأَرْمِيَن	–
2nd	masc.	ramay-ta	ta-**rmī**	ta-rmiy-a	ta-**rmi**	ta-rmiy-anna	ta-rmiy-an	i-**rmi**
2nd	masc.	رَمَيْتَ	تَرْمِي	تَرْمِيَ	تَرْمِ	تَرْمِيَنَّ	تَرْمِيَنْ	اِرْمِ
2nd	fem.	ramay-ti	ta-rm-īna	ta-rm-ī		ta-rm-inna	ta-rm-in	i-rm-ī
2nd	fem.	رَمَيْتِ	تَرْمِينَ	تَرْمِي		تَرْمِنَّ	تَرْمِنْ	اِرْمِي
3rd	masc.	ram-**ā**	ya-**rmī**	ya-rmiy-a	ya-**rmi**	ya-rmiy-anna	ya-rmiy-an	–
3rd	masc.	رَمَی	يَرْمِي	يَرْمِيَ	يَرْمِ	يَرْمِيَنَّ	يَرْمِيَنْ	–
3rd	fem.	ram-at	ta-**rmī**	ta-rmiy-a	ta-**rmi**	ta-rmiy-anna	ta-rmiy-an	–
3rd	fem.	رَمَتْ	تَرْمِي	تَرْمِيَ	تَرْمِ	تَرْمِيَنَّ	تَرْمِيَنْ	–
Dual
2nd		ramay-tumā	ta-rmiy-āni	ta-rmiy-ā		ta-rmiy-ānni	–	i-rmiy-ā
2nd		رَمَيْتُمَا	تَرْمِيَانِ	تَرْمِيَا		تَرْمِيَانِّ	–	اِرْمِيَا
3rd	masc.	ramay-ā	ya-rmiy-āni	ya-rmiy-ā		ya-rmiy-ānni	–	–
3rd	masc.	رَمَيَا	يَرْمِيَانِ	يَرْمِيَا		يَرْمِيَانِّ	–	–
3rd	fem.	ram-atā	ta-rmiy-āni	ta-rmiy-ā		ta-rmiy-ānni	–	–
3rd	fem.	رَمَتَا	تَرْمِيَانِ	تَرْمِيَا		تَرْمِيَانِّ	–	–
Plural
1st		ramay-nā	na-**rmī**	na-rmiy-a	na-**rmi**	na-rmiy-anna	na-rmiy-an	–
1st		رَمَيْنَا	نَرْمِي	نَرْمِيَ	نَرْمِ	نَرْمِيَنَّ	نَرْمِيَنْ	–
2nd	masc.	ramay-tum	ta-rm-ūna	ta-rm-ū		ta-rm-unna	ta-rm-un	i-rm-ū
2nd	masc.	رَمَيْتُمْ	تَرْمُونَ	تَرْمُوا		تَرْمُنَّ	تَرْمُنْ	اِرْمُوا
2nd	fem.	ramay-tunna	ta-rmī-na			ta-rmī-nānni	–	i-rmī-na
2nd	fem.	رَمَيْتُنَّ	تَرْمِينَ			تَرْمِينَانِّ	–	اِرْمِينَ
3rd	masc.	ram-**aw**	ya-rm-ūna	ya-rm-ū		ya-rm-unna	ya-rm-un	–
3rd	masc.	رَمَوْا	يَرْمُونَ	يَرْمُوا		يَرْمُنَّ	يَرْمُنْ	–
3rd	fem.	ramay-na	ya-rmī-na			ya-rmī-nānni	–	–
3rd	fem.	رَمَيْنَ	يَرْمِينَ			يَرْمِينَانِّ	–	–

Two stems each

Each of the two main stems (past and non-past) comes in two variants, a full and a shortened. For the past stem, the full is رَمَيـ ramay-, shortened to رَمـ ram- in much of the third person (i.e. before vowels, in most cases). For the non-past stem, the full is rmiy-, shortened to rm- before -ū -ī. The full non-past stem رْمِيْـ rmiy- appears as رْمِيـ rmī- when not before a vowel; this is an automatic alternation in Classical Arabic. The places where the shortened stems occur are indicated by silver (past), gold (non-past).

Irregular endings

The endings are actually mostly regular. But some endings are irregular, in boldface:

- Some of the third-person past endings are irregular, in particular those in رَمَى ram-ā 'he threw', رَمَوْا ram-aw 'they (masc.) threw'. These simply have to be memorized.
- Two kinds of non-past endings are irregular, both in the "suffixless" parts of the paradigm (largely referring to singular masculine or singular combined-gender). In the indicative, the full stem ـرْمِي -rmī actually appears normally; what is irregular is the lack of the -u normally marking the indicative. In the jussive, on the other hand, the stem actually assumes a unique shortened form ـرْمِـ -rmi, with a short vowel that is not represented by a letter in the Arabic.

===== فَعَا (يَفْعُو) faʿā (yafʿū) =====
The following shows a paradigm of a typical Form I defective (third-weak) verb دَعَا (يَدْعُو) (root: د-ع-و) daʿā (yadʿū) 'to call', parallel to verbs of the فَعَلَ (يَفْعُلُ) faʿala (yafʿulu) type. Verbs of this sort are entirely parallel to verbs of the فَعَا (يَفْعِي) faʿā (yafʿī) type, although the exact forms can still be tricky. See notes following the table for explanation.

Paradigm of a defective (third-weak) و w Arabic verb, دَعَا (يَدْعُو) daʿā (yadʿū) 'to call'
		Past	Present Indicative	Subjunctive	Jussive	Long Energetic	Short Energetic	Imperative
Singular
1st		daʿaw-tu	a-**dʿū**	a-dʿuw-a	a-**dʿu**	a-dʿuw-anna	a-dʿuw-an	–
1st		دَعَوْتُ	أَدْعُو	أَدْعُوَ	أَدْعُ	أَدْعُوَنَّ	أَدْعُوَنْ	–
2nd	masc.	daʿaw-ta	ta-**dʿū**	ta-dʿuw-a	ta-**dʿu**	ta-dʿuw-anna	ta-dʿuw-an	u-**dʿu**
2nd	masc.	دَعَوْتَ	تَدْعُو	تَدْعُوَ	تَدْعُ	تَدْعُوَنَّ	تَدْعُوَنْ	اُدْعُ
2nd	fem.	daʿaw-ti	ta-dʿ-īna	ta-dʿ-ī		ta-dʿ-inna	ta-dʿ-in	u-dʿ-ī
2nd	fem.	دَعَوْتِ	تَدْعِينَ	تَدْعِي		تَدْعِنَّ	تَدْعِنْ	اُدْعِي
3rd	masc.	daʿ-**ā**	ya-**dʿū**	ya-dʿuw-a	ya-**dʿu**	ya-dʿuw-anna	ya-dʿuw-an	–
3rd	masc.	دَعَا	يَدْعُو	يَدْعُوَ	يَدْعُ	يَدْعُوَنَّ	يَدْعُوَنْ	–
3rd	fem.	daʿ-at	ta-**dʿū**	ta-dʿuw-a	ta-**dʿu**	ta-dʿuw-anna	ta-dʿuw-an	–
3rd	fem.	دَعَتْ	تَدْعُو	تَدْعُوَ	تَدْعُ	تَدْعُوَنَّ	تَدْعُوَنْ	–
Dual
2nd		daʿaw-tumā	ta-dʿuw-āni	ta-dʿuw-ā		ta-dʿuw-ānni	–	u-dʿuw-ā
2nd		دَعَوْتُمَا	تَدْعُوَانِ	تَدْعُوَا		تَدْعُوَانِّ	–	اُدْعُوَا
3rd	masc.	daʿaw-ā	ya-dʿuw-āni	ya-dʿuw-ā		ya-dʿuw-ānni	–	–
3rd	masc.	دَعَوَا	يَدْعُوَانِ	يَدْعُوَا		يَدْعُوَانِّ	–	–
3rd	fem.	daʿ-atā	ta-dʿuw-āni	ta-dʿuw-ā		ta-dʿuw-ānni	–	–
3rd	fem.	دَعَتَا	تَدْعُوَانِ	تَدْعُوَا		تَدْعُوَانِّ	–	–
Plural
1st		daʿaw-nā	na-**dʿū**	na-dʿuw-a	na-**dʿu**	na-dʿuw-anna	na-dʿuw-an	–
1st		دَعَوْنَا	نَدْعُو	نَدْعُوَ	نَدْعُ	نَدْعُوَنَّ	نَدْعُوَنْ	–
2nd	masc.	daʿaw-tum	ta-dʿ-ūna	ta-dʿ-ū		ta-dʿ-unna	ta-dʿ-un	u-dʿ-ū
2nd	masc.	دَعَوْتُمْ	تَدْعُونَ	تَدْعُوا		تَدْعُنَّ	تَدْعُنْ	اُدْعُوا
2nd	fem.	daʿaw-tunna	ta-dʿū-na			ta-dʿū-nānni	–	u-dʿū-na
2nd	fem.	دَعَوْتُنَّ	تَدْعُونَ			تَدْعُونَانِّ	–	اُدْعُونَ
3rd	masc.	daʿ-**aw**	ya-dʿ-ūna	ya-dʿ-ū		ya-dʿ-unna	ya-dʿ-un	–
3rd	masc.	دَعَوْا	يَدْعُونَ	يَدْعُوا		يَدْعُنَّ	يَدْعُنْ	–
3rd	fem.	daʿaw-na	ya-dʿū-na			ya-dʿū-nānni	–	–
3rd	fem.	دَعَوْنَ	يَدْعُونَ			يَدْعُونَانِّ	–	–

Verbs of this sort are work nearly identically to verbs of the فَعَى (يَفْعِي) faʿā (yafʿī) type. There are the same irregular endings in the same places, and again two stems in each of the past and non-past tenses, with the same stems used in the same places:

- In the past, the full stem is دَعَوـ daʿaw-, shortened to دَعـ daʿ-.
- In the non-past, the full stem is دْعُوْـ dʿuw-, rendered as دْعُوـ dʿū- when not before a vowel and shortened to دْعـ dʿ- before ـُو، ـِي -ū, -ī.

The Arabic spelling has the following rules:

- In the third person masculine singular past, regular ا ʾalif appears instead of ى ʾalif maqṣūrah: hence دَعَا, not *دَعَى.
- The otiose final alif appears only after the final wāw of the plural, not elsewhere: hence تَدْعُو 'you (masc sg) call (ind)' but تَدْعُوا 'you (masc pl) call (sjv)', even though they are both pronounced تَدْعُو tadʿū.

===== فَعِيَ (يَفْعَى) faʿiya (yafʿā) =====
The following shows a paradigm of a typical Form I defective (third-weak) verb نَسِيَ (يَنْسَ) nasiya (yansā) (root: ن-س-ي) 'to forget', parallel to verbs of the فَعِلَ (يَفْعَلُ) faʿila (yafʿalu) type. These verbs differ in a number of significant respects from either of the above types.

Paradigm of a defective (third-weak) a Arabic verb, نَسِيَ (يَنْسَى) nasiya (yansā) 'to forget'
		Past	Present Indicative	Subjunctive	Jussive	Long Energetic	Short Energetic	Imperative
Singular
1st		nasī-tu	a-**nsā**		a-**nsa**	a-nsay-anna	a-nsay-an	–
1st		نَسِيتُ	أَنْسَى		أَنْسَ	أَنْسَيَنَّ	أَنْسَيَنْ	–
2nd	masc.	nasī-ta	ta-**nsā**		ta-**nsa**	ta-nsay-anna	ta-nsay-an	i-**nsa**
2nd	masc.	نَسِيتَ	تَنْسَى		تَنْسَ	تَنْسَيَنَّ	تَنْسَيَنْ	اِنْسَ
2nd	fem.	nasī-ti	ta-nsa-**yna**	ta-nsa-**y**		ta-nsa-**yinna**	ta-nsa-**yin**	i-nsa-**y**
2nd	fem.	نَسِيتِ	تَنْسَيْنَ	تَنْسَيْ		تَنْسَيِنَّ	تَنْسَيِنْ	اِنْسَيْ
3rd	masc.	nasiy-a	ya-**nsā**		ya-**nsa**	ya-nsay-anna	ya-nsay-an	–
3rd	masc.	نَسِيَ	يَنْسَى		يَنْسَ	يَنْسَيَنَّ	يَنْسَيَنْ	–
3rd	fem.	nasiy-at	ta-**nsā**		ta-**nsa**	ta-nsay-anna	ta-nsay-an	–
3rd	fem.	نَسِيَتْ	تَنْسَى		تَنْسَ	تَنْسَيَنَّ	تَنْسَيَنْ	–
Dual
2nd		nasī-tumā	ta-nsay-āni	ta-nsay-ā		ta-nsay-ānni	–	i-nsay-ā
2nd		نَسِيتُمَا	تَنْسَيَانِ	تَنْسَيَا		تَنْسَيَانِّ	–	اِنْسَيَا
3rd	masc.	nasiy-ā	ya-nsay-āni	ya-nsay-ā		ya-nsay-ānni	–	–
3rd	masc.	نَسِيَا	يَنْسَيَانِ	يَنْسَيَا		يَنْسَيَانِّ	–	–
3rd	fem.	nasiy-atā	ta-nsay-āni	ta-nsay-ā		ta-nsay-ānni	–	–
3rd	fem.	نَسِيَتَا	تَنْسَيَانِ	تَنْسَيَا		تَنْسَيَانِّ	–	–
Plural
1st		nasī-nā	na-**nsā**		na-**nsa**	na-nsay-anna	na-nsay-an	–
1st		نَسِينَا	نَنْسَى		نَنْسَ	نَنْسَيَنَّ	نَنْسَيَنْ	–
2nd	masc.	nasī-tum	ta-nsa-**wna**	ta-nsa-**w**		ta-nsa-**wunna**	ta-nsa-**wun**	i-nsa-**w**
2nd	masc.	نَسِيتُمْ	تَنْسَوْنَ	تَنْسَوْا		تَنْسَوُنَّ	تَنْسَوُنْ	اِنْسَوْا
2nd	fem.	nasī-tunna	ta-nsay-na			ta-nsay-nānni	–	i-nsay-na
2nd	fem.	نَسِيتُنَّ	تَنْسَيْنَ			تَنْسَيْنَانِّ	–	اِنْسَيْنَ
3rd	masc.	nas-ū	ya-nsa-**wna**	ya-nsa-**w**		ya-nsa-**wunna**	ya-nsa-**wun**	–
3rd	masc.	نَسُوا	يَنْسَوْنَ	يَنْسَوْا		يَنْسَوُنَّ	يَنْسَوُنْ	–
3rd	fem.	nasī-na	ya-nsay-na			ya-nsay-nānni	–	–
3rd	fem.	نَسِينَ	يَنْسَيْنَ			يَنْسَيْنَانِّ	–	–

Multiple stems

This variant is somewhat different from the variants with ـِي -ī or ـُو -ū in the non-past. As with other third-weak verbs, there are multiple stems in each of the past and non-past, a full stem composed following the normal rules and one or more shortened stems.

- In this case, only one form in the past uses a shortened stem: نَسُو nas-ū 'they (masc) forgot'. All other forms are constructed regularly, using the full stem نَسِيْـ nasiy- or its automatic pre-consonant variant نَسِيـ nasī-.
- In the non-past, however, there are at least three different stems:
1. The full stem ـنْسَيـ -nsay- occurs before ـَ/ـَى -a/ā- or ـنـ -n-, that is before dual endings, feminine plural endings and energetic endings corresponding to forms that are endingless in the jussive.
2. The modified stem ـنْسَى -nsā occurs in "endingless" forms (i.e. masculine or common-gender singular, plus 1st plural). As usual with third-weak verbs, it is shortened to ـنْسَ -nsa in the jussive. These forms are marked with red.
3. Before endings normally beginning with ـِ/ـِي -i/ī- or ـُ/ـُو -u/ū-, the stem and endings combine into a shortened form: e.g. expected *تَنْسَيِينَ *ta-nsay-īna 'you (fem sg) forget', *تَنْسَيُونَ *ta-nsay-ūna 'you (masc pl) forget' instead become تَنْسَيْنَ ta-nsayna, تَنْسَوْنَ ta-nsawna respectively. The table above chooses to segment them as تَنْسَيْنَ ta-nsa-yna, تَنْسَوْنَ ta-nsa-wna, suggesting that a shortened stem ـنْسَـ -nsa- combines with irregular (compressed) endings ـيْنَ -yna < *ـِينَ *-īna, ـوْنَ -wna < ـُونَ *-ūna. Similarly subjunctive/jussive تَسنَوْا ta-nsaw < تَسنَيُوْا *ta-nsay-ū; but note energetic تَنْسَوُنَّ ta-nsawunna < تَنْسَيُنَّ *ta-nsay-unna, where the original ـيُـ *-yu- has assimilated to ـوُـ -wu-. Consistent with the above analysis, we analyze this form as تَنْسَوُنَّ ta-nsa-wunna, with an irregular energetic ending ـوُنَّ -wunna where a glide consonant has developed after the previous vowel. However, since all moods in this case have a form containing ـنْسَوـ -nsaw-, an alternative analysis would consider ـنْسَوـ -nsaw and ـنْسَيـ -nsay as stems. These forms are marked with gold.

Irregular endings

The endings are actually mostly regular. But some endings are irregular in the non-past, in boldface:

- The non-past endings in the "suffixless" parts of the paradigm (largely referring to singular masculine or singular combined-gender). In the indicative and subjunctive, the modified stem ـنسَاـ -nsā appears, and is shortened to ـنسَـ -nsa in the jussive. In the forms actually appears normally; what is irregular is the lack of the ـُ -u normally marking the indicative. In the jussive, on the other hand, the stem actually assumes a unique shortened form ـنْسَـ -nsa, with a short vowel that is not represented by a letter in the Arabic script.
- In the forms that would normally have suffixes ـِ/ـِي -i/ī- or ـُ/ـُو -u/ū-, the stem and suffix combine to produce ـنْسَيـ -nsay-, ـنْسَوـ -nsaw-. These are analyzed here as consisting of a shortened stem form ـنْسَـ -nsa- plus irregular (shortened or assimilated) endings.

===== فَعُوَ (يَفْعُو) faʿuwa (yafʿū) =====
The following shows a paradigm of a typical Form I defective (third-weak) verb رَخُوَ (يَرْخُو) rakhuwa (yarkhū) (root: ر-خ-و) 'to be slack', parallel to verbs of the فَعُلَ (يَفْعُلُ) faʿula (yafʿulu) type

Paradigm of a defective (third-weak) و w Arabic verb, رَخُوَ (يَرْخُو) rakhuwa (yarkhū) 'to be slack'
		Past	Present Indicative	Subjunctive	Jussive	Long Energetic	Short Energetic	Imperative
Singular
1st		rakhū-tu	a-**rkhū**	a-rkhuw-a	a-**rkhu**	a-rkhuw-anna	a-rkhuw-an	–
1st		رَخُوتُ	أَرْخُو	أَرْخُوَ	أَرْخُ	أَرْخُوَنَّ	أَرْخُوَنْ	–
2nd	masc.	rakhū-ta	ta-**rkhū**	ta-rkhuw-a	ta-**rkhu**	ta-rkhuw-anna	ta-rkhuw-an	u-**rkhu**
2nd	masc.	رَخُوتَ	تَرْخُو	تَرْخُوَ	تَرْخُ	تَرْخُوَنَّ	تَرْخُوَنْ	اُرْخُ
2nd	fem.	rakhū-ti	ta-rkh-īna	ta-rkh-ī		ta-rkh-inna	ta-rkh-in	u-rkh-ī
2nd	fem.	رَخُوتِ	تَرْخِينَ	تَرْخِي		تَرْخِنَّ	تَرْخِنْ	اُرْخِي
3rd	masc.	rakhuw-a	ya-**rkhū**	ya-rkhuw-a	ya-**rkhu**	ya-rkhuw-anna	ya-rkhuw-an	–
3rd	masc.	رَخُوَ	يَرْخُو	يَرْخُوَ	يَرْخُ	يَرْخُوَنَّ	يَرْخُوَنْ	–
3rd	fem.	rakhuw-at	ta-**rkhū**	ta-rkhuw-a	ta-**rkhu**	ta-rkhuw-anna	ta-rkhuw-an	–
3rd	fem.	رَخُوَتْ	تَرْخُو	تَرْخُوَ	تَرْخُ	تَرْخُوَنَّ	تَرْخُوَنْ	–
Dual
2nd		rakhū-tumā	ta-rkhuw-āni	ta-rkhuw-ā		ta-rkhuw-ānni	–	u-rkhuw-ā
2nd		رَخُوتُمَا	تَرْخُوَانِ	تَرْخُوَا		تَرْخُوَانِّ	–	اُرُخُوَا
3rd	masc.	rakhuw-ā	ya-rkhuw-āni	ya-rkhuw-ā		ya-rkhuw-ānni	–	–
3rd	masc.	رَخُوَا	يَرْخُوَانِ	يَرْخُوَا		يَرْخُوَانِّ	–	–
3rd	fem.	rakhuw-atā	ta-rkhuw-āni	ta-rkhuw-ā		ta-rkhuw-ānni	–	–
3rd	fem.	رَخُوَتَا	تَرْخُوَانِ	تَرْخُوَا		تَرْخُوَانِّ	–	–
Plural
1st		rakhū-nā	na-**rkhū**	na-rkhuw-a	na-**rkhu**	na-rkhuw-anna	na-rkhuw-an	–
1st		رَخُونَا	نَرْخُو	نَرْخُوَ	نَرْخُ	نَرْخُوَنَّ	نَرْخُوَنْ	–
2nd	masc.	rakhū-tum	ta-rkh-ūna	ta-rkh-ū		ta-rkh-unna	ta-rkh-un	u-rkh-ū
2nd	masc.	رَخُوتُمْ	تَرْخُونَ	تَرْخُوا		تَرْخُنَّ	تَرْخُنْ	اُرْخُوا
2nd	fem.	rakhū-tunna	ta-rkhū-na			ta-rkhu-nānni	–	u-rkhū-na
2nd	fem.	رَخُوتُنَّ	تَرْخُونَ			تَرْخُونَانِّ	–	اُرْخُونَ
3rd	masc.	rakh-ū	ya-rkh-ūna	ya-rkh-ū		ya-rkh-unna	ya-rkh-un	–
3rd	masc.	رَخُوا	يَرْخُونَ	يَرْخُوا		يَرْخُنَّ	يَرْخُنْ	–
3rd	fem.	rakhū-na	ya-rkhū-na			ya-rkhū-nānni	–	–
3rd	fem.	رَخُونَ	يَرْخُونَ			يَرْخُونَانِّ	–	–

Verbs of this sort are nearly identical to verbs of the فَعِيَ (يَفْعَى) faʿiya (yafʿā) type in past (except employing a different corresponding long vowel) and identical to verbs of the فَعَا (يَفْعُو) faʿā (yafʿū) type in non-past/imperative.

===== فَعَى (يَفْعَى) faʿā (yafʿā) =====
Those verbs are parallel to verbs of the فَعَلَ (يَفْعَلُ) faʿala (yafʿalu).

Verbs of this sort are identical to verbs of the فَعَى (يَفْعِي) faʿā (yafʿī) type in past and فَعِيَ (يَفْعَى) faʿiya (yafʿā) in non-past/imperative.

=== Doubled roots ===
The following shows a paradigm of a typical Form I doubled verb مَدَّ (يَمُدُّ) (root: م-د-د) madda (yamuddu) 'to extend', parallel to verbs of the فَعَلَ (يَفْعُلُ) faʿala (yafʿulu) type. See notes following the table for explanation.

Paradigm of a form I doubled Arabic verb, مَدَّ (يَمُدُّ) madda (yamuddu)"to extend"
		Past	Present Indicative	Subjunctive	Jussive	Long Energetic	Short Energetic	Imperative
Singular
1st		madad-tu	a-mudd-u	a-mudd-a	a-mudd**-a**, ʾa-mudd**-i**, ʾa-mdud	a-mudd-anna	a-mudd-an	–
1st		مَدَدْتُ	أَمُدُّ	أَمُدَّ	أَمُدَّ, أَمُدِّ, أَمْدُدْ	أَمُدَّنَّ	أَمُدَّنْ	–
2nd	masc.	madad-ta	ta-mudd-u	ta-mudd-a	ta-mudd**-a**, ta-mudd**-i**, ta-mdud	ta-mudd-anna	ta-mudd-an	mudd**-a**, mudd**-i**, u-mdud
2nd	masc.	مَدَدْتَ	تَمُدُّ	تَمُدَّ	تَمُدَّ, تَمُدِّ, تَمْدُدْ	تَمُدَّنَّ	تَمُدَّنْ	مُدَّ, مُدِّ, اُمْدُدْ
2nd	fem.	madad-ti	ta-mudd-īna	ta-mudd-ī		ta-mudd-inna	ta-mudd-in	mudd-ī
2nd	fem.	مَدَدْتِ	تَمُدِّينَ	تَمُدِّي		تَمُدِّنَّ	تَمُدِّنْ	مُدِّي
3rd	masc.	madd-a	ya-mudd-u	ya-mudd-a	ya-mudd**-a**, ya-mudd**-i**, ya-mdud	ya-mudd-anna	ya-mudd-an	–
3rd	masc.	مَدَّ	يَمُدُّ	يَمُدَّ	يَمُدَّ, يَمُدِّ, يَمْدُدْ	يَمُدَّنَّ	يَمُدَّنْ	–
3rd	fem.	madd-at	ta-mudd-u	ta-mudd-a	ta-mudd**-a**, ta-mudd**-i**, ta-mdud	ta-mudd-anna	ta-mudd-an	–
3rd	fem.	مَدَّتْ	تَمُدُّ	تَمُدَّ	تَمُدَّ, تَمُدِّ, تَمْدُدْ	تَمُدَّنَّ	تَمُدَّنْ	–
Dual
2nd		madad-tumā	ta-mudd-āni	ta-mudd-ā		ta-mudd-ānni	–	mudd-ā
2nd		مَدَدْتُمَا	تَمُدَّانِ	تَمُدَّا		تَمُدَّانِّ	–	مُدَّا
3rd	masc.	madd-ā	ya-mudd-āni	ya-mudd-ā		ya-mudd-ānni	–	–
3rd	masc.	مَدَّا	يَمُدَّانِ	يَمُدَّا		يَمُدَّانِّ	–	–
3rd	fem.	madd-atā	ta-mudd-āni	ta-mudd-ā		ta-mudd-ānni	–	–
3rd	fem.	مَدَّتَا	تَمُدَّانِ	تَمُدَّا		تَمُدَّانِّ	–	–
Plural
1st		madad-nā	na-mudd-u	na-mudd-a	na-mudd**-a**, na-mudd**-i**, na-mdud	na-mudd-anna	na-mudd-an	–
1st		مَدَدْنَا	نَمُدُّ	نَمُدَّ	نَمُدَّ, نَمُدِّ, نَمْدُدْ	نَمُدَّنَّ	نَمُدَّنْ	–
2nd	masc.	madad-tum	ta-mudd-ūna	ta-mudd-ū		ta-mudd-unna	ta-mudd-un	mudd-ū
2nd	masc.	مَدَدْتُمْ	تَمُدُّونَ	تَمُدُّوا		تَمُدُّنَّ	تَمُدُّنْ	مُدُّوا
2nd	fem.	madad-tunna	ta-mdud-na			ta-mdud-nānni	–	undud-na
2nd	fem.	مَدَدْتُنَّ	تَمْدُدْنَ			تَمْدُدْنَانِّ	–	اُمْدُدْنَ
3rd	masc.	madd-ū	ya-mudd-ūna	ya-mudd-ū		ya-mudd-unna	ya-mudd-un	–
3rd	masc.	مَدُّوا	يَمُدُّونَ	يَمُدُّوا		يَمُدُّنَّ	يَمُدُّنْ	–
3rd	fem.	madad-na	ya-mdud-na			ya-mdud-nānni	–	–
3rd	fem.	مَدَدْنَ	يَمْدُدْنَ			يَمْدُدْنَانِّ	–	–

All doubled verbs are conjugated in a parallel fashion. The endings are for the most part identical to those of strong verbs, but there are two stems (a regular and a modified) in each of the past and non-past. The regular stems are identical to the stem forms of sound verbs, while the modified stems have the two identical consonants pulled together into a geminate consonant and the vowel between moved before the geminate. In the above verb مَدَّ (يَمُدُّ) madda (yamuddu) 'to extend (s.th.)', the past stems are مَدَدـ madad- (regular), مَدّـ madd- (modified), and the non-past stems are مْدُدـ mdud- (regular), مُدّـ mudd- (modified). In the table, places where the regular past stem occurs are in silver, and places where the regular non-past stem occurs are in gold; everywhere else, the modified stem occurs.

No initial vowel is needed in most of the imperative forms because the modified non-past stem does not begin with two consonants.

The concept of having two stems for each tense, one for endings beginning with vowels and one for other endings, occurs throughout the different kinds of weaknesses.

Following the above rules, endingless jussives would have a form like تَمْدُد tamdud, while the corresponding indicatives and subjunctives would have forms like تَمُدُّ tamuddu, تَمُدَّ tamudda. As a result, for the doubled verbs in particular, there is a tendency to harmonize these forms by adding a vowel to the jussives, usually ـَ a, sometimes ـِ i. These are the only irregular endings in these paradigms, and have been indicated in boldface. The masculine singular imperative likewise has multiple forms, based on the multiple forms of the jussive.

There are various types of doubled Form I verbs:

Modified past stem (3rd sg masc)	Regular past stem (3rd pl fem)	Modified non-past stem (3rd sg masc)	Regular non-past stem (3rd pl fem)	Meaning	Sound verb parallel
مَدَّ madd-a	مَدَدْنَ madad-na	يَمُدُّ ya-mudd-u	يَمْدُدْنَ ya-mdud-na	'to extend'	فَعَلَ (يَفْعُلُ) faʿala (yafʿulu)
تَمَّ tamm-a	تَمَمْنَ tamam-na	يَتِمُّ ya-timm-u	يَتْمِمْنَ ya-tmim-na	'to finish'	فَعَلَ (يَفْعِلُ) faʿala (yafʿilu)
ظَلَّ ẓall-a	ظَلِلْنَ ẓalil-na	يَظَلُّ ya-ẓall-u	يَظْلَلْنَ ya-ẓlal-na	'to remain'	فَعِلَ (يَفْعَلُ) faʿila (yafʿalu)
شَرَّ sharra-a	شَرُرْنَ sharur-na	يَشُرُّ ya-shurr-u	يَشْرُرْنَ ya-shrur-na	'to be evil'	فَعُلَ (يَفْعُلُ) faʿula (yafʿulu)

== Formation of derived stems ("forms") ==
Arabic verb morphology includes augmentations of the root, also known as forms, an example of the derived stems found among the Semitic languages. For a typical verb based on a triliteral root (i.e. a root formed using three root consonants), the basic form is termed Form I, while the augmented forms are known as Form II, Form III, etc. The forms in normal use are Form I through Form X; Forms XI through XV exist but are rare and obsolescent. Forms IX and XI are used only with adjectival roots referring to colors and physical defects (e.g. "red", "blue", "blind", "deaf", etc.), and are stative verbs having the meaning of "be X" or "become X" (e.g. Form IX اِحْمَرَّ iḥmarra 'be red, become red, blush', Form XI اِحْمَارَّ iḥmārra with the same meaning). Although the structure that a given root assumes in a particular augmentation is predictable, its meaning is not (although many augmentations have one or more "usual" or prototypical meanings associated with them), and not all augmentations exist for any given root. As a result, these augmentations are part of the system of derivational morphology, not part of the inflectional system.

The construction of a given augmentation is normally indicated using the dummy root f–ʿ–l (ف–ع–ل), based on the verb faʿala 'to do'. Because Arabic has no direct equivalent to the infinitive form of Western languages, the third-person masculine singular past tense is normally used as the dictionary form of a given verb, i.e. the form by which a verb is identified in a dictionary or grammatical discussion. Hence, the word faʿala above actually has the meaning of 'he did', but is translated as 'to do' when used as a dictionary form.

Verbs based on quadriliteral roots (roots with four consonants) also exist. There are four augmentations for such verbs, known as Forms Iq, IIq, IIIq and IVq. These have forms similar to Forms II, V, VII and IX respectively of triliteral verbs. Forms IIIq and IVq are fairly rare. The construction of such verbs is typically given using the dummy verb faʿlala (root: ف-ع-ل-ل). However, the choice of this particular verb is somewhat non-ideal in that the third and fourth consonants of an actual verb are typically not the same, despite the same consonant used for both; this is a particular problem e.g. for Form IVq. The verb tables below use the dummy verb faʿlaqa (root: ف-ع-ل-ق) instead.

Some grammars, especially of colloquial spoken varieties rather than of Classical Arabic, use other dummy roots. For example, A Short Reference Grammar of Iraqi Arabic (Wallace M. Erwin) uses فمل FaMaLa (root: ف-م-ل) and فستل FaSTaLa (root: ف-س-ت-ل) for three and four-character roots, respectively (standing for "First Middle Last" and "First Second Third Last"). Commonly the dummy consonants are given in capital letters.

The system of identifying verb augmentations by Roman numerals is an invention by Western scholars. Traditionally, Arabic grammarians did not number the augmentations at all, instead identifying them by the corresponding dictionary form. For example, Form V would be called "the tafaʿʿala form".

Verbs						Derived nouns			Typical meanings, notes	Examples
	Active voice			Passive voice		Active participle	Passive participle	Verbal noun	Typical meanings, notes	Examples
	Past (3rd sg. masc.)	Present (3rd sg. masc.)	Imperative (2nd sg. masc.)	Past (3rd sg. masc.)	Present (3rd sg. masc.)	sg. masc. nom.		Verbal noun	Typical meanings, notes	Examples
I	فَعَلَ faʿala	يَفْعُلُ yafʿulu	اُفْعُلْ ufʿul	فُعِلَ fuʿila	يُفْعَلُ yufʿalu	فَاعِل fāʿil	مَفْعُول mafʿūl	فَعْل faʿl, فُعُول fuʿūl, فِعْل fiʿl, (فُعْل(ة fuʿl(ah), (فَعَال(ة faʿāl(ah), (فِعَال(ة fiʿāl(ah), etc.	basic verb form	(كتب (يكتب kataba (yaktubu) 'write'; (دخل (يدخل dakhala (yadkhulu) 'enter'; (درس (يدرس darasa (yadrusu) 'study'; (قتل (يقتل qatala (yaqtulu) 'kill'
I	فَعَلَ faʿala	يَفْعِلُ yafʿilu	اِفْعِلْ ifʿil	فُعِلَ fuʿila	يُفْعَلُ yufʿalu	فَاعِل fāʿil	مَفْعُول mafʿūl	فَعْل faʿl, فُعُول fuʿūl, فِعْل fiʿl, (فُعْل(ة fuʿl(ah), (فَعَال(ة faʿāl(ah), (فِعَال(ة fiʿāl(ah), etc.	basic verb form	(حمل (يحمل ḥamala (yaḥmilu) 'carry'; (قدر (يقدر qadara (yaqdiru) 'be able'; (عرف (يعرف ʿarafa (yaʿrifu) 'know'; (جلس (يجلس jalasa (yajlisu) 'sit'
I	فَعَلَ faʿala	يَفْعَلُ yafʿalu	اِفْعَلْ ifʿal	فُعِلَ fuʿila	يُفْعَلُ yufʿalu	فَاعِل fāʿil	مَفْعُول mafʿūl	فَعْل faʿl, فُعُول fuʿūl, فِعْل fiʿl, (فُعْل(ة fuʿl(ah), (فَعَال(ة faʿāl(ah), (فِعَال(ة fiʿāl(ah), etc.	usually with a guttural consonant (ʾ ʿ h ḥ) in second or third position	(قطع (يقطع qaṭaʿa (yaqṭaʿu) 'cut'; (قرأ (يقرأ qaraʾa (yaqraʾu) 'read'; (ظهر (يظهر ẓahara (yaẓharu) 'seem'; (بحث (يبحث baḥatha (yabḥathu) 'search'
I	فَعِلَ faʿila	يَفْعَلُ yafʿalu	اِفْعَلْ ifʿal	فُعِلَ fuʿila	يُفْعَلُ yufʿalu	فَاعِل fāʿil	مَفْعُول mafʿūl	فَعْل faʿl, فُعُول fuʿūl, فِعْل fiʿl, (فُعْل(ة fuʿl(ah), (فَعَال(ة faʿāl(ah), (فِعَال(ة fiʿāl(ah), etc.	often stative verbs (temporary conditions)	(فهم (يفهم fahima (yafhamu) 'understand'; (ركب (يركب rakiba (yarkabu) 'ride'; (شرب (يشرب shariba (yashrabu) 'drink'; (لبس (يلبس labisa (yalbasu) 'wear'
I	فَعِلَ faʿila	يَفْعِلُ yafʿilu	اِفْعِلْ ifʿil	فُعِلَ fuʿila	يُفْعَلُ yufʿalu	فَاعِل fāʿil	مَفْعُول mafʿūl	فَعْل faʿl, فُعُول fuʿūl, فِعْل fiʿl, (فُعْل(ة fuʿl(ah), (فَعَال(ة faʿāl(ah), (فِعَال(ة fiʿāl(ah), etc.	often stative verbs (temporary conditions); rare except with initial و w consonant (which disappears in non-past)	(حسب (يحسب ḥasiba (yaḥsibu) 'estimate'; (وثق (يثق wathiqa (yathiqu) 'trust'
I	فَعُلَ faʿula	يَفْعُلُ yafʿulu	اُفْعُلْ ufʿul	فُعِلَ fuʿila	يُفْعَلُ yufʿalu	فَاعِل fāʿil	مَفْعُول mafʿūl	فَعْل faʿl, فُعُول fuʿūl, فِعْل fiʿl, (فُعْل(ة fuʿl(ah), (فَعَال(ة faʿāl(ah), (فِعَال(ة fiʿāl(ah), etc.	only with stative verbs (permanent conditions)	(كبر (يكبر kabura (yakburu) 'grow big, grow old'; (كثر (يكثر kathura (yakthuru) 'be many, be numerous'; (بعد (يبعد baʿuda (yabʿudu) 'be distant (from)'; (كرم (يكرم karuma (yakrumu) 'be/become noble'
II	فَعَّلَ faʿʿala	يُفَعِّلُ yufaʿʿilu	فَعِّلْ faʿʿil	فُعِّلَ fuʿʿila	يُفَعَّلُ yufaʿʿalu	مُفَعِّل mufaʿʿil	مُفَعَّل mufaʿʿal	تَفْعِيل، تَفْعَال، فِعَّال، تَفْعِلَة tafʿīl, tafʿāl, fiʿʿāl, tafʿila	causative and intensive; denominative; transitive of form I.	كتّب kattaba 'make (someone) write (something)'; دخّل dakhkhala 'bring in (someone/something)'; درّس darrasa 'teach'; قتّل qattala 'massacre'; حمّل ḥammala 'burden, impose'; عرّف ʿarrafa 'announce, inform'; قطّع qaṭṭaʿa 'cut into pieces'
III	فَاعَلَ fāʿala	يُفَاعِلُ yufāʿilu	فَاعِلْ fāʿil	فُوعِلَ fūʿila	يُفَاعَلُ yufāʿalu	مُفَاعِل mufāʿil	مُفَاعَل mufāʿal	مُفَاعَلَة، فِعَال، فِيعَال mufāʿalah, fiʿāl, fīʿāl	the verbs in this form need an indirect object which is often "with" and sometimes "against".	كاتب kātaba 'write to, correspond with (someone)'; داخل dākhala 'befall (someone)'; دارس dārasa 'study with (someone)'; قاتل qātala 'fight'; جالس jālasa 'sit with (someone), keep (someone) company'; قاطع qāṭaʿa 'disassociate (from), interrupt, cut off (someone)'
IV	أَفْعَلَ afʿala	يُفْعِلُ yufʿilu	أَفْعِلْ afʿil	أُفْعِلَ ufʿila	يُفْعَلُ yufʿalu	مُفْعِل mufʿil	مُفْعَل mufʿal	إِفْعَال ifʿāl	usually transitive and causative of form I.	أكتب aktaba 'dictate'; أدخل adkhala 'bring in (someone), bring about (something)'; أقدر aqdara 'enable'; أجلس ajlasa 'seat'; أقطع aqṭaʿa 'make (someone) cut off (something), part company with, bestow as a fief'
V	تَفَعَّلَ tafaʿʿala	يَتَفَعَّلُ yatafaʿʿalu	تَفَعَّلْ tafaʿʿal	تُفُعِّلَ tufuʿʿila	يُتَفَعَّلُ yutafaʿʿalu	مُتَفَعِّل mutafaʿʿil	مُتَفَعَّل mutafaʿʿal	تَفَعُّل، تِفِعَّال tafaʿʿul, tifiʿʿāl	usually reflexive of Form II.	تدخّل tadakhkhala 'interfere, disturb'; تدرّس tadarrasa 'learn'; تحمّل taḥammala 'endure, undergo'; تعرّف taʿarrafa 'become acquainted (with someone), meet'; تقطّع taqaṭṭaʿa 'be cut off, be disrupted, be intermittent'
VI	تَفَاعَلَ tafāʿala	يَتَفَاعَلُ yatafāʿalu	تَفَاعَلْ tafāʿal	تُفُوعِلَ tufūʿila	يُتَفَاعَلُ yutafāʿalu	مُتَفَاعِل mutafāʿil	مُتَفَاعَل mutafāʿal	تَفَاعُل tafāʿul	reciprocal of Form III; and even "pretend to X"	تكاتب takātaba 'correspond with each other'; تداخل tadākhala 'meddle, butt in'; تدارس tadārasa 'study carefully with each other'; تقاتل taqātala 'fight with one another'; تحامل taḥāmala 'maltreat, be biased (against)'; تعارف taʿarrafa 'become mutually acquainted, come to know (something)'; تقاطع taqāṭaʿa 'part company, break off mutual relations, intersect (of roads)'
VII	اِنْفَعَلَ infaʿala	يَنْفَعِلُ yanfaʿilu	اِنْفَعِلْ infaʿil	(اُنْفُعِلَ) (unfuʿila)	(يُنْفَعَلُ) (yunfaʿalu)	مُنْفَعِل munfaʿil	(مُنْفَعَل) (munfaʿal)	اِنْفِعَال infiʿāl	anticausative verb of Form I;	انكتب inkataba 'subscribe'; انقطع inqaṭaʿa 'be cut off, cease, suspend'
VIII	اِفْتَعَلَ iftaʿala	يَفْتَعِلُ yaftaʿilu	اِفْتَعِلْ iftaʿil	اُفْتُعِلَ uftuʿila	يُفْتَعَلُ yuftaʿalu	مُفْتَعِل muftaʿil	مُفْتَعَل muftaʿal	اِفْتِعَال iftiʿāl	reflexive of Form I; often some unpredictable variation in meaning	اكتتب iktataba 'copy (something), be recorded'; اقتتل iqtatala 'fight one another'; احتمل iḥtamala 'carry away, endure, allow'; اقتدر iqtadara 'be able'; iʿtarafa 'confess, recognize'; ; اقتطع iqtaṭaʿa 'take a part (of something), tear out/off, deduct'
IX	اِفْعَلَّ ifʿalla	يَفْعَلُّ yafʿallu	اِفْعَلِلْ ifʿalil	(اُفْعُلَّ) (ufʿulla)	(يُفْعَلُّ) (yufʿallu)	مُفْعَلّ mufʿall	n/a	اِفْعِلَال ifʿilāl	stative verb ("be X", "become X"), specially for colors (e.g. "red", "blue") and physical defects.	احمرّ iḥmarra 'turn red, blush'; اسودّ iswadda 'be/become black'; اصفرّ iṣfarra 'turn yellow, become pale'; احولّ iḥwalla 'be cross-eyed, squint'
X	اِسْتَفْعَلَ istafʿala	يَسْتَفْعِلُ yastafʿilu	اِسْتَفْعِلْ istafʿil	اُسْتُفْعِلَ ustufʿila	يُسْتَفْعَلُ yustafʿalu	مُسْتَفْعِل mustafʿil	مُسْتَفْعَل mustafʿal	اِسْتِفْعَال istifʿāl	"ask to X"; "want to X"; "consider (someone) to be X"; causative, and sometimes autocausative verb; often some unpredictable variation in meaning	استكتب istaktaba 'ask (someone) to write (something)'; استقتل istaqtala 'risk one's life'; استقدر istaqdara 'ask (God) for strength or ability'; استعرف istaʿrafa 'discern, recognize'; استقطع istaqṭaʿa 'request as a fief'
XI	اِفْعَالَّ ifʿālla	يَفْعَالُّ yafʿāllu	اِفْعَالِلْ ifʿālil	(اُفْعُولَّ) (ufʿūlla)	(يُفْعَالُّ) (yufʿāllu)	مُفْعَالّ mufʿāll	n/a	اِفْعِيلَال ifʿīlāl	rare except in poetry; same meaning as Form IX	احمارّ iḥmārra 'turn red, blush'; اصحابّ iṣhābba 'be/become reddish-brown'; الهاجّ ilhājja 'curdle'
XII	اِفْعَوْعَلَ ifʿawʿala	يَفْعَوْعِلُ yafʿawʿilu	اِفْعَوْعِلْ ifʿawʿil	اُفْعُوعِلَ ufʿūʿila	يُفْعَوْعَلُ yufʿawʿalu	مُفْعَوْعِل mufʿawʿil	مُفْعَوْعَل mufʿawʿal	اِفْعِيعَال ifʿīʿāl	very rare, with specialized meanings; often stative	احدودب iḥdawdaba 'be convex, be hunchbacked'; اغدودن ighdawdana 'grow long and luxuriantly (of hair)'; احلولك iḥlawlaka 'be pitch-black'; اخشوشن ikhshawshana 'be rough/crude, lead a rough life'
XIII	اِفْعَوَّلَ ifʿawwala	يَفْعَوِّلُ yafʿawwilu	اِفْعَوِّلْ ifʿawwil	اُفْعُوِّلَ ufʿuwwila	يُفْعَوَّلُ yufʿawwalu	مُفْعَوِّل mufʿawwil	مُفْعَوَّل mufʿawwal	اِفْعِوَّال ifʿiwwāl	very rare, with specialized meanings; often stative	الجوّذ iljawwadha 'gallop'; اعلوّط iʿlawwaṭa 'hang on the neck of (a camel)'
XIV	اِفْعَنْلَلَ ifʿanlala	يَفْعَنْلِلُ yafʿanlilu	اِفْعَنْلِلْ ifʿanlil	اُفْعُنْلِلَ ufʿunlila	يُفْعَنْلَلُ yufʿanlalu	مُفْعَنْلِل mufʿanlil	مُفْعَنْلَل mufʿanlal	اِفْعِنْلَال ifʿinlāl	very rare, with specialized meanings; often stative	اقعنسس iqʿansasa 'have a protruding chest and hollow back, be pigeon-breasted'; اقعندد iqʿandada 'reside'; اسحنكك isḥankaka 'become very dark'
XV	اِفْعَنْلَى ifʿanlā	يَفْعَنْلَى yafʿanlā	اِفْعَنْلَ ifʿanla	اُفْعُنْلِيَ ufʿunliya	يُفْعَنْلَى yufʿanlā	مُفْعَنْلٍ mufʿanlin	مُفْعَنْلًى mufʿanlan	اِفْعِنْلَاء ifʿinlāʾ	very rare, with specialized meanings; often stative	احرنبى iḥranbā 'become very furious'; اغرندى ighrandā 'curse and hit (someone)'
Iq	فَعْلَقَ faʿlaqa	يُفَعْلِقُ yufaʿliqu	فَعْلِقْ faʿliq	فُعْلِقَ fuʿliqa	يُفَعْلَقُ yufaʿlaqu	مُفَعْلِق mufaʿliq	مُفَعْلَق mufaʿlaq	فَعْلَقَة faʿlaqat, فَعْلَاق faʿlāq, فِعْلَاق fiʿlāq, فُعْلَاق fuʿlāq	basic form, often transitive or denominative; similar to Form II, but verbal noun is different; reduplicated roots of the form فعفع faʿfaʿa are common, sometimes فعفل faʿfala is also seen	دحرج daḥraja 'roll (something)'; ترجم tarjama 'translate, interpret'; هندس handasa 'sketch, make a plan'; بيطر bayṭara 'practice veterinary surgery' (< 'veter(inary)'); زلزل zalzala 'shake (something), frighten'; وسوس waswasa 'whisper'; غرغر gharghara 'gargle'
IIq	تَفَعْلَقَ tafaʿlaqa	يَتَفَعْلَقُ yatafaʿlaqu	تَفَعْلَقْ tafaʿlaq	تُفُعْلِقَ tufuʿliqa	يُتَفَعْلَقُ yutafaʿlaqu	مُتَفَعْلِق mutafaʿliq	مُتَفَعْلَق mutafaʿlaq	تَفَعْلُق tafaʿluq	reflexive of Form Iq; frequentative intransitive denominative; similar to Form V	تدحرج tadaḥraja 'roll' (intrans.)'; تزلزل tazalzala 'shake (intrans.), tremble'; تفلسف tafalsafa 'philosophize' (< فيلسوفـ faylasūf- 'philosopher'); تمذهب tamadhhaba 'follow a sect' (< مذهبـ madhhab- 'sect' < ذهب dhahaba 'go'); تقهقر taqahqara 'be driven back'
IIIq	اِفْعَنْلَقَ ifʿanlaqa	يَفْعَنْلِقُ yafʿanliqu	اِفْعَنْلِقْ ifʿanliq	اُفْعُنْلِقَ ufʿunliqa	يُفْعَنْلَقُ yufʿanlaqu	مُفْعَنْلِق mufʿanliq	مُفْعَنْلَق mufʿanlaq	اِفْعِنْلَاق ifʿinlāq	rare	اخرنطم ikhranṭama 'be proud' (cf. الخرطوم al-Kharṭūm- 'Khartoum')
IVq	اِفْعَلَقَّ ifʿalaqqa	يَفْعَلِقُّ yafʿaliqqu	اِفْعَلْقِقْ ifʿalqiq	اُفْعُلِقَّ ufʿuliqqa	يُفْعَلَقُّ yufʿalaqqu	مُفْعَلِقّ mufʿaliqq	مُفْعَلَقّ mufʿalaqq	اِفْعِلْقَاق ifʿilqāq	usually intransitive; somewhat rare	اطمأنّ iṭmaʾanna 'be tranquil, calm'; اضمحلّ iḍmaḥalla 'fade away, dwindle'; اقشعرّ iqshaʿarra 'shudder with horror'

Each form can have either active or passive forms in the past and non-past tenses, so reflexives are different from passives.

Note that the present passive of forms I and IV are the same. Otherwise there is no confusion.

=== Sound verbs ===
Sound verbs are those verbs with no associated irregularities in their constructions. Verbs with irregularities are known as weak verbs; generally, this occurs either with (1) verbs based on roots where one or more of the consonants (or radicals) is w (wāw, و), y (yāʾ, ي) or the glottal stop ʾ (hamzah, ﺀ); or (2) verbs where the second and third root consonants are the same.

Some verbs that would be classified as "weak" according to the consonants of the verb root are nevertheless conjugated as a strong verb. This happens, for example:

- Largely, to all verbs whose only weakness is a hamzah radical; the irregularity is in the Arabic spelling but not the pronunciation, except in a few minor cases.
- Largely, to all verbs whose only weakness is a y in the first radical (the "assimilated" type).
- To all verbs conjugated in Forms II, III, V, VI whose only weakness is a و w or ي y in the first or second radicals (or both).

=== Form VIII assimilations ===
Form VIII has a ـتـ -t- that is infixed into the root, directly after the first root consonant. This ـتـ -t- assimilates to certain coronal consonants occurring as the first root consonant. In particular, with roots whose first consonant is د، ز، ث، ذ، ص، ط، ض، ظ d z th dh ṣ ṭ ḍ ẓ, the combination of root and infix ت t appears as دّ، زد، ثّ، ذّ، صط، طّ، ضط، ظّ dd zd thth dhdh ṣṭ ṭṭ ḍṭ ẓẓ. That is, the t assimilates the emphasis of the emphatic consonants ص، ط، ض، ظ ṣ ṭ ḍ ẓ and the voicing of د، ز d z, and assimilates entirely to the interdental consonants ث، ذ، ظ th dh ẓ. The consonant cluster ضط ḍṭ, as in اضطرّ iḍṭarra 'compel, force', is unexpected given modern pronunciation, having a voiced stop next to a voiceless one; this reflects the fact that ط ṭ was formerly pronounced voiced, and ض ḍ was pronounced as the emphatic equivalent not of د d but of an unusual lateral sound. (ض ḍ was possibly an emphatic voiced alveolar lateral fricative /ɮˤ/ or a similar affricated sound /dɮˤ/ or /dˡˤ/; see the article on the letter ض ḍād.)

=== Defective (third-weak) verbs ===
Other than for Form I active, there is only one possible form for each verb, regardless of whether the third root consonant is و w or ي y. All of the derived third-weak verbs have the same active-voice endings as (فعى (يفعي faʿā (yafʿī) verbs except for Forms V and VI, which have past-tense endings like (فعى (يفعي faʿā (yafʿī) verbs but non-past endings like (فعي (يفعى faʿiya (yafʿā) verbs. The passive-voice endings of all third-weak verbs (whether Form I or derived) are the same as for the (فعي (يفعى faʿiya (yafʿā) verbs. The verbal nouns have various irregularities: feminine in Form II, -in declension in Form V and VI, glottal stop in place of root w/y in Forms VII–X.

The active and passive participles of derived defective verbs consistently are of the -in and -an declensions, respectively.

Defective Form IX verbs are extremely rare. Heywood and Nahmad list one such verb, اِعْمَايَ iʿmāya 'be/become blind', which does not follow the expected form *اِعْمَيَّ *iʿmayya. They also list a similarly rare Form XI verb اِعْمَايَّ iʿmāyya 'be/become blind', this time with the expected form.

Verbs						Derived nouns		
	Active voice			Passive voice		Active participle	Passive participle	Verbal noun
	Past (3rd sg. masc.)	Present (3rd sg. masc.)	Imperative (2nd sg. masc.)	Past (3rd sg. masc.)	Present (3rd sg. masc.)	sg. masc. nom.		Verbal noun
I	فَعَا faʿā	يَفْعُو yafʿū	اُفْعُ ufʿu	فُعِيَ fuʿiya	يُفْعَى yufʿā	فَاعٍ fāʿin	مَفْعُوّ mafʿuww	فَعْي faʿy, فَعْو faʿw, فَعًى faʿan, فِعًى fiʿan, فَعَاء faʿāʾ, فَاعِية fāʿiyah, فِعَاية fiʿāyah, فَعَاوة faʿāwah, مَفْعَاة mafʿāh, مَفْعِية mafʿiyah, فُعْية fuʿyah, فُعْوة fuʿwah, فُعُوْ fuʿuww, فُعْوَان fuʿwān, etc.
I	فَعُوَ faʿuwa	يَفْعُو yafʿū	اُفْعُ ufʿu	فُعِيَ fuʿiya	يُفْعَى yufʿā	فَاعٍ fāʿin	مَفْعُوّ mafʿuww	فَعْي faʿy, فَعْو faʿw, فَعًى faʿan, فِعًى fiʿan, فَعَاء faʿāʾ, فَاعِية fāʿiyah, فِعَاية fiʿāyah, فَعَاوة faʿāwah, مَفْعَاة mafʿāh, مَفْعِية mafʿiyah, فُعْية fuʿyah, فُعْوة fuʿwah, فُعُوْ fuʿuww, فُعْوَان fuʿwān, etc.
I	فَعِيَ faʿiya	يَفْعَى yafʿā	اِفْعَ ifʿa	فُعِيَ fuʿiya	يُفْعَى yufʿā	فَاعٍ fāʿin	مَفْعِيّ mafʿiyy	فَعْي faʿy, فَعْو faʿw, فَعًى faʿan, فِعًى fiʿan, فَعَاء faʿāʾ, فَاعِية fāʿiyah, فِعَاية fiʿāyah, فَعَاوة faʿāwah, مَفْعَاة mafʿāh, مَفْعِية mafʿiyah, فُعْية fuʿyah, فُعْوة fuʿwah, فُعُوْ fuʿuww, فُعْوَان fuʿwān, etc.
I	فَعَى faʿā	يَفْعَى yafʿā	اِفْعَ ifʿa	فُعِيَ fuʿiya	يُفْعَى yufʿā	فَاعٍ fāʿin	مَفْعِيّ mafʿiyy	فَعْي faʿy, فَعْو faʿw, فَعًى faʿan, فِعًى fiʿan, فَعَاء faʿāʾ, فَاعِية fāʿiyah, فِعَاية fiʿāyah, فَعَاوة faʿāwah, مَفْعَاة mafʿāh, مَفْعِية mafʿiyah, فُعْية fuʿyah, فُعْوة fuʿwah, فُعُوْ fuʿuww, فُعْوَان fuʿwān, etc.
I	فَعَى faʿā	يَفْعِي yafʿī	اِفْعِ ifʿi	فُعِيَ fuʿiya	يُفْعَى yufʿā	فَاعٍ fāʿin	مَفْعِيّ mafʿiyy	فَعْي faʿy, فَعْو faʿw, فَعًى faʿan, فِعًى fiʿan, فَعَاء faʿāʾ, فَاعِية fāʿiyah, فِعَاية fiʿāyah, فَعَاوة faʿāwah, مَفْعَاة mafʿāh, مَفْعِية mafʿiyah, فُعْية fuʿyah, فُعْوة fuʿwah, فُعُوْ fuʿuww, فُعْوَان fuʿwān, etc.
II	فَعَّى faʿʿā	يُفَعِّي yufaʿʿī	فَعِّ faʿʿi	فُعِّيَ fuʿʿiya	يُفَعَّى yufaʿʿā	مُفَعٍّ mufaʿʿin	مُفَعًّى mufaʿʿan	تَفْعِيَة tafʿiyah
III	فَاعَى fāʿā	يُفَاعِي yufāʿī	فَاعِ fāʿi	فُوعِيَ fūʿiya	يُفَاعَى yufāʿā	مُفَاعٍ mufāʿin	مُفَاعًى mufāʿan	مُفَاعَاة mufāʿāh, فِعَاء fiʿāʾ
IV	أَفْعَى afʿā	يُفْعِي yufʿī	أَفْعِ afʿi	أُفْعِيَ ufʿiya	يُفْعَى yufʿā	مُفْعٍ mufʿin	مُفْعًى mufʿan	إِفْعَاء ifʿāʾ
V	تَفَعَّى tafaʿʿā	يَتَفَعَّى yatafaʿʿā	تَفَعَّ tafaʿʿa	تُفُعِّيَ tufuʿʿiya	يُتَفَعَّى yutafaʿʿā	مُتَفَعٍّ mutafaʿʿin	مُتَفَعًّى mutafaʿʿan	تَفَعٍّ tafaʿʿin
VI	تَفَاعَى tafāʿā	يَتَفَاعَى yatafāʿā	تَفَاعَ tafāʿa	تُفُوعِيَ tufūʿiya	يُتَفَاعَى yutafāʿā	مُتَفَاعٍ mutafāʿin	مُتَفَاعًى mutafāʿan	تَفَاعٍ tafāʿin
VII	اِنْفَعَى infaʿā	يَنْفَعِي yanfaʿī	اِنْفَعِ infaʿi	(اُنْفُعِيَ) (unfuʿiya)	(يُنْفَعَى) (yunfaʿā)	مُنْفَعٍ munfaʿin	مُنْفَعًى munfaʿan	اِنْفِعَاء infiʿāʾ
VIII	اِفْتَعَى iftaʿā	يَفْتَعِي yaftaʿī	اِفْتَعِ iftaʿi	اُفْتُعِيَ uftuʿiya	يُفْتَعَى yuftaʿā	مُفْتَعٍ muftaʿin	مُفْتَعًى muftaʿan	اِفْتِعَاء iftiʿāʾ
IX	(اِفْعايَ (اِفْعَيَيْت ifʿāya (ifʿayaytu?)	(يَفْعَايُ (يَفْعَيْنَ yafʿāyu (yafʿayna?)	اِفْعَيْ ifʿay?	—	—	مُفْعَاي mufʿāy	—	اِفْعِيَاء ifʿiyāʾ
X	اِسْتَفْعَى istafʿā	يَسْتَفْعِي yastafʿī	اِسْتَفْعِ istafʿi	اُسْتُفْعِيَ ustufʿiya	يُسْتَفْعَى yustafʿā	مُسْتَفْعٍ mustafʿin	مُسْتَفْعًى mustafʿan	اِسْتِفْعَاء istifʿāʾ

=== Hollow (second-weak) verbs ===
Only the forms with irregularities are shown. The missing forms are entirely regular, with w or y appearing as the second radical, depending on the root. There are unexpected feminine forms of the verbal nouns of Form IV, X.

Verbs						Derived nouns		
	Active voice			Passive voice		Active participle	Passive participle	Verbal noun
	Past (3rd sg. masc.)	Present (3rd sg. masc.)	Imperative (2nd sg. masc.)	Past (3rd sg. masc.)	Present (3rd sg. masc.)	sg. masc. nom.		Verbal noun
I	(فَالَ (فِلْت fāla (filtu)	يَفِيلُ yafīlu	فِلْ fil	فِيلَ fīla	يُفَالُ yufālu	فَائِل fāʾil	مَفِيل mafīl	usually فَوْل fawl, فَيْل fayl; also فُول fūl, فَوَال fawāl, (فِيَال(ة fiyāl(ah), فِوَال fiwāl, فُوَال fuwāl, (مَفَال(ة mafāl(ah), مَفِيل mafīl etc.
I	(فَالَ (فُلْت fāla (fultu)	يَفُولُ yafūlu	فُلْ ful	فِيلَ fīla	يُفَالُ yufālu	فَائِل fāʾil	مَفُول mafūl	usually فَوْل fawl, فَيْل fayl; also فُول fūl, فَوَال fawāl, (فِيَال(ة fiyāl(ah), فِوَال fiwāl, فُوَال fuwāl, (مَفَال(ة mafāl(ah), مَفِيل mafīl etc.
I	(فَالَ (فِلْت fāla (filtu)	يَفَالُ yafālu	فَلْ fal	فِيلَ fīla	يُفَالُ yufālu	فَائِل fāʾil	مَفِيل mafīl	usually فَوْل fawl, فَيْل fayl; also فُول fūl, فَوَال fawāl, (فِيَال(ة fiyāl(ah), فِوَال fiwāl, فُوَال fuwāl, (مَفَال(ة mafāl(ah), مَفِيل mafīl etc.
I	(فَالَ (فِلْت fāla (filtu)	يَفَالُ yafālu	فَلْ fal	فِيلَ fīla	يُفَالُ yufālu	فَائِل fāʾil	مَفُول mafūl	usually فَوْل fawl, فَيْل fayl; also فُول fūl, فَوَال fawāl, (فِيَال(ة fiyāl(ah), فِوَال fiwāl, فُوَال fuwāl, (مَفَال(ة mafāl(ah), مَفِيل mafīl etc.
IV	(أَفَالَ (أَفَلْت afāla (ʾafaltu)	يُفِيلُ yufīlu	أَفِلْ afil	أُفِيلَ ufīla	يُفَالُ yufālu	مُفِيل mufīl	مُفَال mufāl	إِفَالَة ifālah
VII	(اِنْفَالَ (اِنْفَلْت infāla (infaltu)	يَنْفَالُ yanfālu	اِنْفَلْ infal	(اُنْفِيلَ) (unfīla)	(يُنْفَالُ) (yunfālu)	مُنْفَال munfāl		اِنْفِيَال infiyāl
VIII	(اِفْتَالَ (اِفْتَلْت iftāla (iftaltu)	يَفْتَالُ yaftālu	اِفْتَلْ iftal	اُفْتِيلَ uftīla	يُفْتَالُ yuftālu	مُفْتَال muftāl		اِفْتِيَال iftiyāl
X	اِسْتَفَالَ istafāla	يَسْتَفِيلُ yastafīlu	اِسْتَفِلْ istafil	اُسْتُفِيلَ ustufīla	يُسْتَفَالُ yustafālu	مُسْتَفِيل mustafīl	مُسْتَفَال mustafāl	اِسْتِفَالَة istifālah

=== Assimilated (first-weak) verbs ===
When the first radical is w, it drops out in the Form I non-past. Most of the derived forms are regular, except that the sequences uw iw are assimilated to ū ī, and the sequence wt in Form VIII is assimilated to tt throughout the paradigm. The following table only shows forms with irregularities in them.

The initial w also drops out in the common Form I verbal noun علة ʿilah (e.g. صلة ṣilah 'arrival, link' from وصلة waṣalah 'arrive'). Root: و-ع-ل

Verbs						Derived nouns		
	Active voice			Passive voice		Active participle	Passive participle	Verbal noun
	Past (3rd sg. masc.)	Present (3rd sg. masc.)	Imperative (2nd sg. masc.)	Past (3rd sg. masc.)	Present (3rd sg. masc.)	sg. masc. nom.		Verbal noun
I	وَعَلَ waʿala	**يَعَلُ** **yaʿalu**	**عَلْ** **ʿal**	وُعِلَ wuʿila	**يُوعَلُ** **yūʿalu**	واعِل(ة) wāʿil(ah)	**مَوْعُود(ة)** **mawʿūd(ah)**	**وَعْل، وُعُول، عِلة** **waʿl, wuʿūl, ʿilah** etc.
I	وَعَلَ waʿala	**يَعِلُ** **yaʿilu**	**عِلْ** **ʿil**	وُعِلَ wuʿila	**يُوعَلُ** **yūʿalu**	واعِل(ة) wāʿil(ah)	**مَوْعُود(ة)** **mawʿūd(ah)**	**وَعْل، وُعُول، عِلة** **waʿl, wuʿūl, ʿilah** etc.
I	وَعِلَ waʿila	**يعِلُ** **yaʿilu**	**عِلْ** **ʿil**	وُعِلَ wuʿila	**يُوعَلُ** **yūʿalu**	واعِل(ة) wāʿil(ah)	**مَوْعُود(ة)** **mawʿūd(ah)**	**وَعْل، وُعُول، عِلة** **waʿl, wuʿūl, ʿilah** etc.
I	وَعِلَ waʿila	يَوْعَلُ yawʿalu	اُوعَلْ ūʿal	وُعِلَ wuʿila	**يُوعَلُ** **yūʿalu**	واعِل(ة) wāʿil(ah)	**مَوْعُود(ة)** **mawʿūd(ah)**	**وَعْل، وُعُول، عِلة** **waʿl, wuʿūl, ʿilah** etc.
I	وَعُلَ waʿula	يَوْعُلُ yawʿulu	اُوعُلْ ūʿul	وُعِلَ wuʿila	**يُوعَلُ** **yūʿalu**	واعِل(ة) wāʿil(ah)	**مَوْعُود(ة)** **mawʿūd(ah)**	**وَعْل، وُعُول، عِلة** **waʿl, wuʿūl, ʿilah** etc.
IV	أَوْعَلَ ʾawʿala	يُوعِلُ yūʿilu	أَوْعِلْ ʾawʿil	أُوعِلَ ʾūʿila	يُوعَلُ yūʿalu	مُوعِل(ة) mūʿil(ah)	مُوعَل(ة) mūʿal(ah)	إيعال(ة) ʾīʿāl(ah)
VIII	اِتَّعَلَ ittaʿala	يَتَّعِلُ yattaʿilu	اِتَّعِلْ ittaʿil	اُتُّعِلَ uttuʿila	يُتَّعَلُ yuttaʿalu	مُتَّعِل(ة) muttaʿil(ah)	مُتَّعَل(ة) muttaʿal(ah)	اِتِّعال(ة) ʾittiʿāl(ah)
X	اِسْتَوْعَلَ istawʿala	يَسْتَوْعِلُ yastawʿilu	اِسْتَوْعِلْ istawʿil	اُسْتُوعِلَ ustūʿila	يُسْتَوْعَلُ yustawʿalu	مُسْتَوْعِل(ة) mustawʿil(ah)	مُسْتَوْعَل(ة) mustawʿal(ah)	اِسْتِيعال(ة) istīʿāl(ah)

When the first radical is y, the forms are largely regular. The following table only shows forms that have some irregularities in them, indicated in boldface. Root: ي-ع-ل

Verbs						Derived nouns		
	Active voice			Passive voice		Active participle	Passive participle	Verbal noun
	Past (3rd sg. masc.)	Present (3rd sg. masc.)	Imperative (2nd sg. masc.)	Past (3rd sg. masc.)	Present (3rd sg. masc.)	sg. masc. nom.		Verbal noun
I	يَعَلَ yaʿala	يَيْعُلُ yayʿulu	**اُوعُلْ** **ūʿul**	يُعِلَ yuʿila	**يُوعَلُ** **yūʿalu**	ياعِل(ة) yāʿil(ah)	مَيْعُود(ة) mayʿūd(ah)	يَعْل(ة) yaʿl(ah) etc.
I	يَعَلَ yaʿala	يَيْعِلُ yayʿilu	**اِيعِلْ** **īʿil**	يُعِلَ yuʿila	**يُوعَلُ** **yūʿalu**	ياعِل(ة) yāʿil(ah)	مَيْعُود(ة) mayʿūd(ah)	يَعْل(ة) yaʿl(ah) etc.
I	يَعَلَ yaʿala	يَيْعَلُ yayʿalu	**اِيعَلْ** **īʿal**	يُعِلَ yuʿila	**يُوعَلُ** **yūʿalu**	ياعِل(ة) yāʿil(ah)	مَيْعُود(ة) mayʿūd(ah)	يَعْل(ة) yaʿl(ah) etc.
I	يَعِلَ yaʿila	يَيْعِلُ yayʿilu	**اِيعِلْ** **ʾīʿil**	يُعِلَ yuʿila	**يُوعَلُ** **yūʿalu**	ياعِل(ة) yāʿil(ah)	مَيْعُود(ة) mayʿūd(ah)	يَعْل(ة) yaʿl(ah) etc.
I	يَعُلَ yaʿula	يَيْعُلَ yayʿulu	**اُوعُلْ** **ūʿul**	يُعِلَ yuʿila	**يُوعَلُ** **yūʿalu**	ياعِل(ة) yāʿil(ah)	مَيْعُود(ة) mayʿūd(ah)	يَعْل(ة) yaʿl(ah) etc.
IV	أَيْعَلَ ʾayʿala	**يُوعِلُ** **yūʿilu**	أَيْعِلْ ʾayʿil	**أُوعِلَ** **ʾūʿila**	**يُوعَلُ** **yūʿalu**	**مُوعِل(ة)** **mūʿil(ah)**	**مُوعَل(ة)** **mūʿal(ah)**	**إيعال(ة)** **ʾīʿāl(ah)**
VIII	**اِتَّعَلَ** **ittaʿala**	**يَتَّعِلُ** **yattaʿilu**	**اِتَّعِلْ** **ittaʿil**	**اُتُّعِلَ** **uttuʿila**	**يُتَّعَلُ** **yuttaʿalu**	**مُتَّعِل(ة)** **muttaʿil(ah)**	**مُتَّعَل(ة)** **muttaʿal(ah)**	**اِتِّعال(ة)** **ittiʿāl(ah)**
X	اِسْتَيْعَلَ istayʿala	يَسْتَيْعِلُ yastayʿilu	اِسْتَيْعَلْ istayʿil	**اُسْْتُوعِلَ** **ustūʿila**	يُسْتَيْعَلُ yustayʿalu	مُسْْتَيْعِل(ة) mustayʿil(ah)	مُسْْتَيْعَل(ة) mustayʿal(ah)	**اِسْتِيعال(ة)** **istīʿāl(ah)**

=== Doubled verbs ===
Root: ف-ل-ل

Verbs						Derived nouns		
	Active voice			Passive voice		Active participle	Passive participle	Verbal noun
	Past (3rd sg. masc.)	Present (3rd sg. masc.)	Imperative (2nd sg. masc.)	Past (3rd sg. masc.)	Present (3rd sg. masc.)	sg. masc. nom.		Verbal noun
I	فَلَّ (فَلَلْتُ) falla (falaltu)	يَفُلُّ yafullu	فُلَّ، فُلِّ، اُفْلُلْ fulla, fulli, uflul	فُلَّ fulla	يُفَلُّ yufallu	فالّ(ة) fāll(ah)	مَفْلُول(ة) maflūl(ah)	فَلّ(ة)، فَلَالَة fall(ah), falālah etc.
I	فَلَّ (فَلَلْتُ) falla (falaltu)	يَفِلُّ yafillu	فِلَّ، فِلِّ، اِفْلِلْ filla, filli, iflil	فُلَّ fulla	يُفَلُّ yufallu	فالّ(ة) fāll(ah)	مَفْلُول(ة) maflūl(ah)	فَلّ(ة)، فَلَالَة fall(ah), falālah etc.
I	فَلَّ (فَلَلْتُ) falla (falaltu)	يَفَلُّ yafallu	فَلَّ، فَلِّ، اِفْلَلْ falla, falli, iflal	فُلَّ fulla	يُفَلُّ yufallu	فالّ(ة) fāll(ah)	مَفْلُول(ة) maflūl(ah)	فَلّ(ة)، فَلَالَة fall(ah), falālah etc.
I	فَلَّ (فَلِلْتُ) falla (faliltu)	يَفَلُّ yafallu	فَلَّ، فَلِّ، اِفْلَلْ falla, falli, iflal	فُلَّ fulla	يُفَلُّ yufallu	فالّ(ة) fāll(ah)	مَفْلُول(ة) maflūl(ah)	فَلّ(ة)، فَلَالَة fall(ah), falālah etc.
I	فَلَّ (فَلُلْتُ) falla (falultu)	يَفُلُّ yafullu	فُلَّ، فُلِّ، اُفْلُلْ fulla, fulli, uflul	فُلَّ fulla	يُفَلُّ yufallu	فالّ(ة) fāll(ah)	مَفْلُول(ة) maflūl(ah)	فَلّ(ة)، فَلَالَة fall(ah), falālah etc.
III	فالَّ fālla	يُفَلُّ yufāllu	فالَّ، فالِّ، فالِلْ fālla, fālli, fālil	فُولَّ fūlla	يُفالُّ yufāllu	مُفالّ(ة) mufāll(ah)		مُفالَّت(ة)، فِلال(ة) mufāllat(ah), filāl(ah)
IV	أَفَلَّ ʾafalla	يُفِلُّ yufillu	أَفِلَّ، أَفِلِّ، أَفْلِلْ ʾafilla, ʾafilli, ʾaflil	أُفِلَّ ʾufilla	يُفَلُّ yufallu	مُفِلّ(ة) mufill(ah)	مُفَلّ(ة) mufall(ah)	إفْلال(ة) ʾiflāl(ah)
VI	تَفالَّ tafālla	يَتَفالُّ yatafāllu	تَفالَلْ tafālal	تُفُولَّ tufūlla	يُتَفالُّ yutafāllu	مُتَفالّ(ة) mutafāll(ah)		تَفالّ(ة) tafāll(ah)
VII	اِنْفَلَّ infalla	يَنْفَلُّ yanfallu	اِنْفَلَّ، اِنْفَلِّ، اِنْفَلِلْ infalla, infalli, infalil	n/a		مُنْفَلّ(ة) munfall(ah)		اِنْفِلال(ة) infilāl(ah)
VIII	اِفْتَلَّ iftalla	يَفْتَلُّ yaftallu	اِفْتَلَّ، اِفْتَلِّ، اِفْتَلِلْ iftalla, iftalli, iftalil	اُفْتُلَّ uftulla	تُفْتَلُّ yuftallu	مُفْتَلّ(ة) muftall(ah)		اِفْتِلال(ة) iftilāl(ah)
X	اِسْتَفَلَّ istafalla	يَسْتَفِلُّ yastafillu	اِسْتَفِلَّ، اِسْتَفِلِّ، اِسْتَفْلِلْ istafilla, istafilli, istaflil	اُسْتُفِلَّ ustufilla	يُسْتَفَلُّ yustafallu	مُسْتَفِلّ(ة) mustafill(ah)	مُسْتَفَلّ(ة) mustafall(ah)	اِسْتِفْلال(ة) istiflāl(ah)

=== Hamzated verbs ===
The largest problem with so-called "hamzated" verbs (those with a glottal stop ʾ or "hamzah" as any of the root consonants) is the complicated way of writing such verbs in the Arabic script (see the article on hamzah for the rules regarding this). In pronunciation, these verbs are in fact almost entirely regular.

The only irregularity occurs in verbs with a hamzah ء as the first radical. A phonological rule in Classical Arabic disallows the occurrence of two hamzahs in a row separated by a short vowel, assimilating the second to the preceding vowel (hence ʾaʾ ʾiʾ ʾuʾ become ʾā ʾī ʾū). This affects the following forms:

- The first-person singular of the non-past of Forms I, IV and VIII.
- The entire past and imperative of Form IV.

In addition, any place where a hamzat al-waṣl (elidable hamzah) occurs will optionally undergo this transformation. This affects the following forms:

- The entire imperative of Form I.
- The entire past and imperative of Form VIII, as well as the verbal noun of Form VIII.

There are the following irregularities:

- The common verbs ʾakala (أكل; root: ء-ك-ل) 'eat', ʾakhadha (أخذ; root: ء-خ-ذ) 'take', ʾamara (أمر; root: ء-م-ر) 'command' have irregular, short imperatives kul, khudh, mur.
- Form VIII of the common verb ʾakhadha 'take' is ittakhadha 'take on, assume', with irregular assimilation of the hamzah.
- The common verb saʾala yasʾalu 'ask' has an alternative non-past yasalu with missing hamzah.

Verbs						Derived nouns		
	Active voice			Passive voice		Active participle	Passive participle	Verbal noun
	Past (3rd sg. masc.)	Present (3rd sg. masc.)	Imperative (2nd sg. masc.)	Past (3rd sg. masc.)	Present (3rd sg. masc.)	sg. masc. nom.		Verbal noun
I	أَعَلَ ʾaʿala (root: ء-ع-ل)	يأْعُلُ (آعُلُ) yaʾʿulu (ʾāʿulu)	أُؤْعُلْ، اُوعُلْ ʾuʿul, ūʿul	أُعِلَ ʾuʿila	يُؤْعَلُ (أُوعَلُ) yuʾʿalu (ʾūʿalu)	آعِلْ ʾāʿil	مأْعُول(ة) maʾʿūl(ah)	أَعْل(ة) ʾaʿl(ah) etc.
etc.
IV	آعَلَ ʾāʿala	يؤْعِلُ (أُوعِلُ) yuʾʿilu (ʾūʿilu)	آعِلْ ʾāʿil	أُوعِلَ ʾūʿila	يؤْعَلُ (أُوعَلُ) yuʾʿalu (ʾūʿalu)	مؤْعِل(ة) muʾʿil(ah)	مؤْعَل(ة) muʾʿal(ah)	إيعال(ة) ʾīʿāl(ah)
VIII	اِئْتَعَلَ، اِيتَعَلَ iʾtaʿala, ītaʿala	يَأْتَعِلُ (آتَعِلُ) yaʾtaʿilu (ʾātaʿilu)	اِئْتَعِلْ، اِيتَعِلْ iʾtaʿil, ītaʿil	اُؤْتُعِلَ، اُوتُعِلَ uʾtuʿila, ūtuʿila	يؤْتَعَلَ (اُوتَعَلَ) yuʾtaʿala (ūtaʿala)	مؤْتَعِل(ة) muʾtaʿil(ah)	مؤْتَعَل(ة) muʾtaʿal(ah)	اِئْتِعال(ة)، اِيتِعال(ة) iʾtiʿāl(ah), ītiʿāl(ah)

=== Doubly weak verbs ===
Doubly weak verbs have two "weak" radicals; a few verbs are also triply weak. Generally, the above rules for weak verbs apply in combination, as long as they do not conflict. The following are cases where two types of weaknesses apply in combination:

- Verbs with a w in the first radical and a w or y in the third radical. These decline as defective (third-weak) verbs, and also undergo the loss of w in the non-past of Form I, e.g. waqā yaqī 'guard', wafā yafī 'complete, fulfill (a promise)', waliya yalī 'be near, follow'. These verbs have extremely short imperatives qi fi li (feminine qī fī lī, masculine plural qū fū lū, feminine plural iqna ifna ilna), although these are not normally used in Modern Standard Arabic. Similarly, verbs of this sort in Form IV and Form VIII are declined as defective but also have the normal assimilations of w-initial verbs, e.g. Form IV awfā yūfī 'fulfill a vow', Form VIII ittaqā yattaqī 'fear (God)', augmentations of wafā yafī and waqā yaqī, respectively (see above).
- Verbs with a hamzah in the first radical and a w or y in the third radical. These decline as defective (third-weak) verbs, and also undergo the assimilations associated with the initial hamzah, e.g. the common verb ʾatā yaʾtī 'come' (first singular non-past ʾātī 'I come') and the related Form IV verb ʾātā yuʾtī 'bring' (first singular non-past ʾūtī 'I bring').

The following are examples where weaknesses would conflict, and hence one of the "weak" radicals is treated as strong:

- Verbs with a w or y in both the second and third radicals. These are fairly common, e.g. rawā yarwī 'recount, transmit'. These decline as regular defective (third-weak) verbs; the second radical is treated as non-weak.
- Verbs with a w in the first radical and the second and third radicals the same. These verbs do not undergo any assimilations associated with the first radical, e.g. wadda (wadidtu) yawaddu 'to love'.
- Verbs with a hamza in the first radical and the second and third radicals the same. These verbs do not undergo any assimilations associated with the first radical, e.g. ʾajja yaʾujju 'burn', first singular non-past ʾaʾujju 'I burn', despite the two hamzahs in a row.

The following are cases with special irregularities:

- Verbs with a w or y in the second radical and a hamzah in the third radical. These are fairly common, e.g. the extremely common verb jāʾa yajīʾu 'come'. The only irregularity is the Form I active participle, e.g. jāʾin 'coming', which is irregularly declined as a defective (third-weak) participle (presumably to avoid a sequence of two hamzahs in a row, as the expected form would be *jāʾiʾ).
- The extremely common verb raʾā yarā 'see'. The hamzah drops out entirely in the non-past. Similarly in the passive, ruʾiya yurā 'be seen'. The active participle is regular rāʾin and the passive participle is regular marʾīy-. The related Form IV verb arā yūrī 'show' is missing the hamzah throughout. Other augmentations are regular: Form III rāʾā yurāʾī 'dissemble', Form VI tarāʾā yatarāʾā 'look at one another', Form VIII irtaʾā yartaʾī 'think'.
- The common verb ḥayiya yaḥyā 'live', with an alternative past tense ḥayya. Form IV aḥyā yuḥyī 'resuscitate, revive' is regular. Form X istaḥyā yastaḥyī 'spare alive, feel ashamed' also appears as istaḥayya and istaḥā.

=== Summary of vowels ===
The vowels for the various forms are summarized in this table:

	Active voice		Passive voice		Active participle	Passive participle	Verbal noun
	Past (3rd sg. masc.)	Present (3rd sg. masc.)	Past (3rd sg. masc.)	Present (3rd sg. masc.)			
Before first root consonant (if vowel is present)	a in Forms IV–VI. In Forms VII–XII one has i when the hamzah is not elided.	a except in Forms II–IV, where it is u.	u	u, and a after the t of Forms V and VI	u	u except in Form I, where it is a.	a in Forms II, V, and VI. In Forms VII–XII one has i when the hamzah is not elided.
Just before 2nd root consonant	a, ā, or none	a, ā, or none	u, ū, or none	a, ā, or none	a, ā, or none	a, ā, or none	i, a, ā, or none
Just before third root consonant	a	Form I a, i, or u. a in Forms V, VI, and IX, i in others.	i	a	i except in Form IX, where it is a.	a except in Form I, where it is ū.	ī in Form II, u in Forms V and VI, ā elsewhere
After final root consonant, 3rd person sg. indicative	a	u	a	u	n/a	n/a	n/a

== Verbs in colloquial Arabic ==
The Classical Arabic system of verbs is largely unchanged in the colloquial spoken varieties of Arabic. The same derivational system of augmentations exists, including triliteral Forms I through X and quadriliteral Forms I and II, constructed largely in the same fashion (the rare triliteral Forms XI through XV and quadriliteral Forms III and IV have vanished). The same system of weaknesses (strong, defective/third-weak, hollow/second-weak, assimilated/first-weak, doubled) also exists, again constructed largely in the same fashion. Within a given verb, two stems (past and non-past) still exist along with the same two systems of affixes (suffixing past-tense forms and prefixing/suffixing non-past forms).

The largest changes are within a given paradigm, with a significant reduction in the number of forms. The following is an example of a regular verb paradigm in Egyptian Arabic.

Example of a regular Form I verb in Egyptian Arabic, kátab/yíktib "write"
Tense/Mood		Past	Present Subjunctive	Present Indicative	Future	Imperative
Singular
1st		katáb-t كتبت	á-ktib أكتب	bá-ktib بكتب	ḥá-ktib حكتب	
2nd	masc	katáb-t كتبت	tí-ktib تكتب	bi-tí-ktib بتكتب	ḥa-tí-ktib حتكتب	í-ktib اكتب
2nd	fem	katáb-ti كتبت	ti-ktíb-i تكتبي	bi-ti-ktíb-i بتكتبي	ḥa-ti-ktíb-i حتكتبي	i-ktíb-i اكتبي
3rd	masc	kátab كتب	yí-ktib يكتب	bi-yí-ktib بيكتب	ḥa-yí-ktib حيكتب	
3rd	fem	kátab-it كتبت	tí-ktib تكتب	bi-tí-ktib بتكتب	ḥa-tí-ktib حتكتب	
Plural
1st		katáb-na كتبنا	ní-ktib نكتب	bi-ní-ktib بنكتب	ḥá-ní-ktib حنكتب	
2nd		katáb-tu كتبتوا	ti-ktíb-u تكتبوا	bi-ti-ktíb-u بتكتبوا	ḥa-ti-ktíb-u حتكتبوا	i-ktíb-u اكتبوا
3rd		kátab-u كتبوا	yi-ktíb-u يكتبوا	bi-yi-ktíb-u بيكتبوا	ḥa-yi-ktíb-u حيكتبوا	

Example of a regular Form I verb in Moroccan Arabic, kteb/ykteb "write"
Tense/Mood		Past	Present Subjunctive	Present Indicative	Future	Imperative
Singular
1st		kteb-t كتبت	né-kteb نكتب	ka-né-kteb كنكتب	gha-né-kteb غنكتب	
2nd	masc	ktéb-ti كتبت	té-kteb تكتب	ka-té-kteb كتكتب	gha-té-kteb غتكتب	kteb كتب
2nd	fem	ktéb-ti كتبتي	té-ktebi تكتبي	ka-té-ktebi كتكتبي	gha-té-ktebi غتكتبي	ktebi كتبي
3rd	masc	kteb كتب	y-kteb يكتب	ka-y-kteb كيكتب	gha-y-kteb غيكتب	
3rd	fem	ktéb-et كتبت	té-kteb تكتب	ka-té-kteb كتكتب	gha-té-kteb غتكتب	
Plural
1st		ktéb-na كتبنا	n-kétbu نكتبوا	ka-n-kétbu كنكتبوا	gha-n-kétbu غنكتبوا	
2nd		ktéb-tiw كتبتيوا	t-kétb-u تكتبوا	ka-t-kétb-u كتكتبوا	gha-n-kétb-u غتكتبوا	kétb-u كتبوا
3rd		ktéb-u كتبوا	y-ktéb-u يكتبوا	ka-y-kétb-u كيكتبوا	gha-y-kétb-u غيكتبوا	

This paradigm shows clearly the reduction in the number of forms:

- The thirteen person/number/gender combinations of Classical Arabic have been reduced to eight, through the loss of dual and feminine-plural forms. (Some varieties still have feminine-plural forms, generally marked with the suffix -an, leading to a total of ten forms. This occurs, for example, in Iraqi Arabic and in many of the varieties of the Arabian peninsula.)
- The system of suffix-marked mood distinctions has been lost, other than the imperative. Egyptian Arabic and many other "urban" varieties (e.g. Moroccan Arabic, Levantine Arabic) have non-past endings -i -u inherited from the original subjunctive forms, but some varieties (e.g. Iraqi Arabic) have -īn -ūn endings inherited from the original indicative. Most varieties have also gained new moods, and a new future tense, marked through the use of prefixes (most often with an unmarked subjunctive vs. an indicative marked with a prefix, e.g. Egyptian bi-, Levantine b-, Moroccan ta-/ka-). Various particles are used for the future (e.g. Egyptian ḥa-, Levantine raḥ-, Moroccan gha(di)-), derived from reduced forms of various verbs.
- The internal passive is lost almost everywhere. Instead, the original reflexive/mediopassive augmentations (e.g. Forms V, VI, VII) serve as both reflexive and passive. The passive of Forms II and III is generally constructed with a reflex of Forms V and VI, using a prefix it- derived from the Classical prefix ta-. The passive of Form I uses either a prefix in- (from Form VII) or it- (modeled after Forms V and VI). The other forms often have no passive.

In addition, Form IV is lost entirely in most varieties, except for a few "classicizing" verbs (i.e. verbs borrowed from Modern Standard Arabic).

See varieties of Arabic for more information on grammar differences in the spoken varieties.

== Negation ==
The negation of Arabic verbs varies according to the tense of the verb phrase. In literary Modern Standard Arabic, present-tense verbs are negated by adding لا lā "not" before the verb, past-tense verbs are negated by adding the negative particle لَمْ lam "not" before the verb, and putting the verb in the jussive mood; and future-tense expressions are negated by placing the negative particle لَنْ lan before the verb in the subjunctive mood.

== See also ==
- Wiktionary's appendix on Arabic verb forms
