= Esteghlal =

Esteghlal or Esteqlal (Persian: استقلال) is a Persian word meaning independence. It is used as a prefix by many Iranian association football clubs and Armenian football clubs. This includes:

- Esteghlal F.C. – Iranian football club
- Esteghlal Ahvaz F.C. – Iranian football club
- Esteghlal Meli-Sanati Khuzestan F.C. – Iranian football club
- Esteghlal Bandar Anzali F.C. – Iranian football club
- Esteghlal Mollasani F.C. - Iranian football club
- Esteghlal Ardabil F.C. – Iranian football club
- Esteghlal Bojnurd F.C. – Iranian football club
- Esteghlal Buer Ahmad F.C. – Iranian football club
- Esteghlal Dushanbe – Tajikistani football club
- Esteghlal Tashkent — Uzbekistani football club
- Esteghlal Kish F.C. – defunct Iranian football club
- Esteghlal-Kotayk Abovian – Armenian football club
- Esteghlal Rasht F.C. – defunct Iranian football club
- Esteghlal Takestan F.C. – Iranian football club
- Esteghlal Iravan F.C. – Armenian football club

== See also ==
- Istiqlal (disambiguation)
