= Istiqlal =

Istiqlal (Arabic: اِسْتِقْلال, romanized: istiqlāl) means independence and may refer to:

== Political parties ==
- Azərbaycan Milli İstiqlal Partiyası or Azerbaijan National Independence Party, political party in Azerbaijan
- Harakat Al-Istiqlal or Independence Movement (Lebanon), political party in Lebanon
- Haras al Istiqlal or Guardians of Independence, Iraqi political party under the British Mandate of Mesopotamia
- Hizb al-Istiqlal or Independence Party (Mandatory Palestine), Arab political party under the British Mandate of Palestine
- Istiqlal Party, the Hizb al-istiqlāl or Independence Party, political party in Morocco
- Tehreek-e-Istiqlal or Independence Movement, political party in Pakistan

== Other uses ==
- Istiglal anti-materiel rifle, Azerbaijani gun
- Istiqlal Mosque, Jakarta, or Masjid Istiqlal, or Independence Mosque, National mosque of Indonesia
- Istiqlal Mosque in Haifa, Israel
- Istiglal Ordeni, the Independence Order, Azerbaijani honour
- Istiqlál, the name of the last day of the week in the Baháʼí calendar, corresponding to Friday
- Istiqlal, a Uyghur exile-operated media organization based in Turkey
- Istiglaliyyat Street in Baku, Azerbaijan
- Yom-e-Istiqlal, or Independence Day (Pakistan)

== See also ==
- İstiklal (disambiguation)
- Esteghlal (disambiguation)
