= Matis language =

Panoan language spoken in Brazil

Matis
- matses
- Native to: Brazil
- Region: Amazonas
- Ethnicity: Matis
- Native speakers: 320 (2008)
- Language family: Panoan: Mayoruna; Mayo; Matis group; Matis

Official status
- Official language in: Brazil (Amazonas)

Language codes
- ISO 639-3: mpq
- Glottolog: mati1255
- ELP: Matís
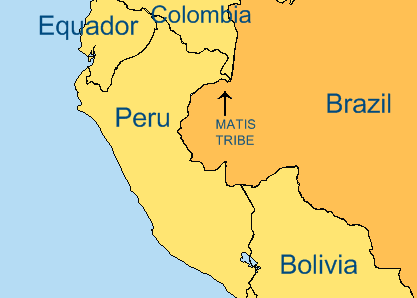
- Map of Matis people and language

Matis is a language spoken by the indigenous Matis people in the state of Amazonas in Brazil, on the border of Brazil and Peru. There are currently an estimated 350 Matis speakers. Matis language has a high level of transmission, especially among women and children, who are generally monolingual in Matis only. Portuguese is spoken by older Matis men for trade purposes.

== Name ==
Because Matis is the non-indigenous name given to this community, some members prefer to refer to themselves by their original name, matses. There is another indigenous group called the Mayoruna that is of close linguistic and geographical proximity to the Matis and also goes by the name Matses. To avoid confusion of the two groups, most literature about the Matis refers to them as Matis. The word matses means 'human being' in the Matis language, and is often used in kinship groupings in the language.

== Classification ==
The Matis language is part of the Panoan branch of the Pano-Tacanan language family, a family of about 32 languages and 40,000-50,000 total speakers. Only 18 Panoan languages are still spoken today, six of which are falling out of everyday use. It is the fifth largest language family in South America, with speakers of Pano-Tacanan languages living in Perú, Brazil, and Bolivia. Within the Pano language family, Matis language lies on the Mayoruna branch along with three other extant and four extinct languages. Matis is the most linguistically divergent extant language in the Mayoruna branch.

Due to the mutual intelligibility of many Pano languages, most speakers of Matis can also understand languages spoken by the Kulina, Matses (Mayoruna), and the Korubo. The Marubo acted as interpreters between the Matis and Funai during the first contacts with outsiders in the 1970s.

== Documentation ==
A key researcher and publisher of many works on Matis language is Vitória Regina Spanghero Ferreira. Her master's thesis was a phonetic and phonological description of Matis language that discussed phonemes and allophones, syllable structure, phonological processes, and accentuation patterns of Matis. Ferreira's doctoral thesis, published in 2005, is a very detailed lexical study of Matis language that includes a 1,547-word Portuguese-Matis dictionary. The dissertation goes into detail on the lexicography, semantics, and morphosyntax of Matis language as well as giving overviews of Matis and Pano ethno-history.

Rogério Vicente Ferreira, a researcher at the Universidade Federal de Mato Grosso do Sul, has also produced a number of key texts regarding the Matis language. Among the most descriptive is a thorough morphosyntactic description of the language that discusses phonetic and morphological aspects, nouns, verbs, adverbs, adjectives, and closed class words of the Matis language. His master's thesis also goes over morphosyntactic elements of Matis language. The paper discusses various classes of words, the order of constituents, marcation of the ergative case, and general themes in Matis syntax. The paper builds on phonological work done by V. Ferreira (2000).

A masters dissertation studying the functional-typological system of word formation in eight languages of the Pano family, including Matis, was published by Raphael Augusto Oliveira Barbosa. The paper features a thorough comparison of the semantic and morphological properties of word formation among the different Pano languages, with a specific focus on affixation, reduplication and composition.

While no large ethnography specifically about the Matis community has been published, information about their culture and customs can be gained through multiple ethnographic studies and comparisons written about larger regional or linguistic groupings of languages. Javari details the eight ethnic groups living around the Vale do Javari. Barbara Maisonnave Arisi's 2007 master's thesis studies the relationship between the Matis and the Korubo, both relatively isolated groups living in the Vale do Javari. All previously listed literature from Rogérico and Vitória Ferreira include ethno-histories of the Matis people as background for the studies, most notably in the text Estúdio Lexical da Língua Matís: Subsídios para um Dicionário Bilíngüe, which contains photos and descriptions of specific cultural practices.

The BBC documentary TV series Tribe featured the Matis in an episode in 2007.

== History ==
The Fundação Nacional do Índio (Funai) was a key player in establishing first contact with the Matis community. After the construction of a major highway through the region, Funai began receiving reports of uncontacted peoples in the region. The Matis before this point in time were isolated and removed from any outside, non-indigenous contact and this highway acted as a path to resources, which would later assist the Matis, as well as other indigenous peoples. Funai went on to establish the Ituí Indigenous Attraction Post (IAP) on the bank of the Ituí river in 1974. Reports on the first contact with the Matis people conflict, but this event likely happened in 1975 or 1976. Soon after this period, the Matis began making occasional visits to the Ituí IAP, where they were given resources such as metal tools and animals. By 1987, contacts between Funai and the Matis were becoming frequent and the Matis people had already suffered many cases of the flu.

The spread of foreign diseases like influenza and measles intensified with the growing presence of rubber tappers and loggers in the region, and lack of warning and medical aid from the IAP. Debates surround the actual number of indigenous Matis that died from exposure to foreign disease, but probable figures state that 35-50% of the population succumbed, with children and elders severely impacted. The Matis were later relocated by Funai to the Boeiro creek region, and this change of location coupled with the change in demographics caused the group to fragment into two distinct groups which are still present today. A new scarcity of available ingredients for preparing traditional substances for hunting and ritual caused the group to change from highly motile to predominantly sedentary, and created much conflict within the group.

Along with the introduction of illness to indigenous Matis communities, there has been recent conflict between the Matis and Korubo communities living in the Vale do Javari. The Matis in the twentieth century have been said to have abducted two women from the Korubo community due to low numbers of women in theirs. The Korubo peoples had since attacked ancestors of the Matis (Txami) who returned to the Coari River to start their own plantations. The relatively recent conflict between these groups has led to long lasting grudges, abductions, and murder.

The acceptance of outside influences varies depending on the generations within the community. Elders are more hesitant, while other modern Matis generations are more receptive to schools and modern-day influences. The Centro do Trabalho Indigenista (CTI) is an educational centre that was established in 1979 to educate current and future generations of members of the Pano language family. To ensure cultural survival for the Matis as well as other indigenous groups in the Vale de Javari, the Centro do Trabalho Indigenista uses professors who have been elected by local indigenous peoples to properly ensure their cultural values, day-to-day activities, and more importantly, languages are preserved to their standards.

== Phonology ==
Vowels in Matis
	Front	Central	Back
Close	i	ɨ	u
Near-close			(ʊ)
Close-mid	e		o
Open-mid	(ɛ)		(ɔ)
Open		a	

Consonants in Matis
		Bilabial	Alveolar	Retroflex	Palatal	Velar	Glottal
Plosive	voiceless	p	t			k	(ʔ)
Plosive	voiced	b	d			(ɡ)	
Affricate			ts	tʂ	tʃ		
Nasal		m	n			(ŋ)	
Flap			(ɾ)				
Fricative		(β)	s	ʂ	ʃ		
Approximant		w			j		

== Morphology ==
Matis possesses a complex morphological structure similar to that of other Pano languages. Due to the high prevalence of morphemes in Matis language, it is considered by most linguists to be a polysynthetic language. There are two general classes of morphemes used in Matis: simple and complex. Simple morphemes are those that denote a single meaning; complex morphemes contain multiple meanings. The morphological processes used in Matis are prefixation, suffixation, reduplication, and atonalization, with prefixation utilized very rarely and the latter three being more common.

=== Nouns ===
Nouns in the Matis language constitute an open class and are characterized by their case, gender, and number. The ergative, absolutive and comitative cases are used for nouns.

==== Pronouns ====
Matis contains ergative, absolutive, and object pronouns.

	Ergative	Absolutive	Object
1sg, 1 + 3 Exclusive	ɨnbi	ɨbi	ɨbi
2 sg	minbi	mibi	mibi
3 sg	∅	∅	∅
1 + 2 (inclusive)	nuki	nuki	nuki
2 pl	mikui	mikui	mitso
3 pl	∅	∅	∅
Co-referent 3 sg	anbi	abi	

minbi -dapa witsu ʃe- -a -k
2SG.ERG -EMPH bracelet weave- -PAS.REC -DECL
"It was you who made the bracelet."

ɨnbi pusan -Ø pe- -a -k
1SG.ERG preguiça -ABS eat- -PAS.REC -DECL
"I ate the preguiça"

Bɨuʂ -ɨn takada -Ø ɨbi bɨ- -ʂun -bo -ʂ
Bɨuʂ -ERG hen -ABS SG.ABS bring -BEN -PAS.REC -3
"Bɨuʂ brought the hen to me."

Additionally, in the Matis language there are personal pronouns, demonstrative pronouns, reflexive pronouns, possessive pronouns and interrogative pronouns.

Examples:

Personal Pronoun: mi (you)
Demonstrative Pronoun: nekit- (that)
Reflexive Pronoun: Reflexive pronoun is formed with the use of the suffix (–ben), e.g. mi+ben (yourself)
Possessive Pronoun: nuki- (ours)
Interrogative Pronoun: awɨ- (what)

=== Prefixes ===
Prefixation in Matis is much less common than suffixation and it is only used in two instances. The first is the prefix {paʂ-}, which simply means "slightly" or "somewhat".

minbi paʂ- bed -kin bed- -a -k
2SG.ERG slightly take -simult.A/S>A take -PAS.REC -DECL
"You took it lightly" (lit. You took fast took)

The second type of prefixation used in Matis relates to different parts of the body through the use of 27 different prefixes that can be used to modify verbs, nouns, and adjectives. This type of morpheme is also common in other languages of the Pano family.

In Example Two, the morpheme {ta-} is created for the word "taɨ", or "foot". This prefix is attached to the verb, along with other morphemes, to imply that the cutting, which happened in the past, was done with relation to the foot.

taɨ: "foot"

ɨbi vidru -n ta- dɨd- -a -k
1SG.ABS glass -INSTR foot- cut- -PAS.REC -DECL
"I cut my foot on glass." (lit. The glass cut (on the) foot)

Many of these prefixes possess multiple meanings apart from body parts depending on their attachment and the context of the sentence. A good example of this, as shown in Example Three, is the morpheme {an-}, which denotes relation to "ana", or "tongue". However, this morpheme can also denote that a verb is taking place on the "interior" or "inside of" something.

ana: "tongue", "interior", "inside of"

Rogeru -n papi nunte an- tsadun -a -ʂ
Rogério -ERG boy canoe {inside of-} {put (seated)-} -PAS.REC -3.EXP
"Rogério put the boy seated into the canoe"

Prefixes can refer to parts of the body in a literal or metaphorical sense. For example, as shown in Example Four, the morpheme {bɨ-}, which is derived from the word "bɨmadɨn" or "face", can also metaphorically mean "in front of" in certain contexts.

bɨmadɨn: "face", "in front"

min carru -Ø bɨ- duk- -e -k
2P.POSS car -ABS face- {be in fours-} -NPASS -DECL
"Your car is in front of you"

=== Suffixes ===
In the Matis language, suffixes are used more frequently than prefixes. Suffixes are the most common morphemes to add to the end of root words derived from nouns, verbs, adjectives, and adverbs. Nouns and verbs can use multiple suffixes, however adjectives and adverbs use only one. To elaborate on the use of suffixes in the Matis language, this section will discuss ergative/absolutive cases that are used frequently within the Matis language to demonstrate the complexity of suffixation in one of many linguistic areas.

In Matis, ergativity is marked by the morpheme suffix "-n" and the absolutive marked with a "∅". When there is a final ending of a nominal root word that ends in a vowel, the ergative suffix to be applied would be "-n". This is demonstrated in example one.

tuma -n awat -Ø koroka -e
Tuma -ERG tapir -ABS cook -NPASS
‘Tuma cooks the tapir’

Another suffix morpheme phenomenon with ergativity is when a root word ends in a nasal sound or "n" - or when the root word ends in an alveolar occlusive consonant such as "t", the initial morpheme "-n" allomorphs into "-an" which is conditioned by the ending of the root word. This is demonstrated in example two.

wesnit → wesnit –an
‘mutant’

When the root word ends in all other consonants, the ergative suffix changes to "-ɨn". This suggests that the two allomorphs of the ergative rely heavily on the ending of the root word, specifically the type of consonant or vowel being used to apply the appropriate suffix. This is demonstrated in example three.

Matsés -ɨn kamun -∅ pe- -emen
Matis -ERG jaguar -ABS eat -NEG.NPASS
"The Matis do not eat jaguar."

=== Verbs ===
Verbs in Matis fall under two tenses: time which has not yet passed and time that has passed. This second category can be broken up into subcategories which detail more precisely how much time has passed. To distinguish how much time has passed, Matis uses words such as nebi (now), uxtokin (yesterday) and inden (long time ago/ back in the day).

=== Case and agreement ===
Matis is an ergative-absolutive language. The subject of intransitive and transitive verbs are marked in the same way. The agent is what stays fixed depending on the sentence structure.

uʃtokin tumi -n unkin -Ø tonka
yesterday tumi -ERG pig -ABS killed
"Yesterday, Tumi killed the pig"

papi -Ø uʃ -e -k dukek
man -ABS sleeps -NPASS -DECL, deit
"The man sleeps (hanging)"

abad -e -k bina -Ø
runs -NPASS -DECL Bina -ABS
"Bina runs"

=== Verb Tense ===
Verbs in the Matis language are broken down into two tenses: time not yet passed, and past. The past tense is broken down into three categories: time immediately passed, time recently passed, and distant time passed.

Past tense: suffixes –a, -bo and –bo are used in the verb and are tied to the time in which the action occurred. Speakers use temporal words: nebi (now), uxtokin (yesterday), inden (longtime ago, back in the day) to reference the time of the action.

ɨ -n -bi I Ø tʃe -a -k
I -ERG -sg eel -ABS ate -PASS.IM -DECL
"I ate eel"

nu -ki -Ø tʃo -b
I -PL -ABS come -PAS.REC
"We arrived (today)"

kidipi -n mates -Ø tanawa -bonda -ʃ
Fillipe -ERG matis -ABS know -PAS.DIS -3
"Fillipe knew how to speak Matis"

rogeriu -n datonkete -Ø ʃik -e -k
Rogério -ERG shirt -ABS clean -NPASS -DECL
"Rogério cleans clothes"

setkeʃ madiwin -Ø tʃ0 -I -k
tomorrow mariwin -ABS come -NPASS -DECL
"Tomorrow, Mariwin comes"

== Syntax ==
=== Case ===
Matis is an ergative-absolutive language. Matis in particular uses allomorph suffixes to distinguish the ergativity using "-n", and "-Ø" when marking the absolutive case. Additional allomorphed suffixes can be applied to mark both cases when specific grammatical rules apply, such as when a word ends in a vowel or specific consonant. In Matis, the following syntactic orders are observed: "AOV", "OAV" and "AVO" in sentences constructed with transitive verbs, and "SV" and "VS" is in sentences constructed with intransitive verbs. Only one can be considered the dominant order, which is AOV for sentences with transitive verbs and "SV" (at times "VS") for sentences with intransitive verbs. However, in transitive sentences in the Matis language, the structure "OVA" is not used.

One main observable ergative-absolutive feature of the Matis language is the marking of the object in the transitive sentences (tʃawa -Ø and txawa -Ø) and the subject of the intransitive sentences (wapa -Ø / awat -Ø) in the same manner. In both formations in which sentences are utilizing transitive verbs, the agent remained constant. The suffixed allomorphs used to distinguish the two are using "-n" (marking ergativity) and "-Ø" (marking absolutive).

==== Transitive sentences ====
A O V
papi-n tʃawa-Ø tonka-e
man-ERG queixada-ABS {(to) kill-NPASS}
'The man killed the queixada.'

A O V
mi-n-bi txawa-Ø pe-a-k
2-ERG-SG queixada-ABS eat-PASS.IM-DECL
'You ate (the) queixada.'

==== Intransitive sentences ====
S V
wapa-Ø uʃ-a-k
dog-ABS slept-PASS.IM-DECL
'The dog slept'

V S
abad-e-k awat-Ø
{(to) run-NPASS-DECL} tapir-ABS
'The tapir runs'

== Semantics ==
=== Quantification ===
Quantifiers in Matis are a closed class of words that can be used to modify nouns, verbs, adverbs, and adjectives. The functions of quantifiers differ depending on their syntactic position. Quantifiers placed after a noun always function in quantification. However, when a quantifier is placed after an adverb or adjective, it functions as an intensifier. Some quantifiers are restricted to either countable or uncountable nouns, while others can be used in conjunction with both.

The four quantifiers used in the Matis language are as follows:

dadenpa: "many, in large quantity" (used with both countable and uncountable nouns)
kimo: "much" (used only with uncountable nouns)
dabɨtsɨk: "few" (used with countable nouns)
papitsɨk: "little, small amount" (used with uncountable nouns)

waka -n i dadenpa
river -LOC ray intens.qtd
"many rays in the river"

ɨnbi waka -∅ papitsɨk -∅ ak- -nu
1SG.ERG water -ABS {a little} -ABS drink- -DES
"I want to drink a little bit of water"

i -∅ -bɨ buɨt kimo abad -e -k
1 -ABS -SG quickly very run -NPASS -DECL
"I ran very quickly."

dadasibo -∅ tʃonod -e -k dadnepa ʃakak -e -men
{old man} -ABS {to work} -NPASS -DECL much tire -NPASS -NEG.NPASS
"The old man works a lot (every day) without tiring."
