= Switch-reference =

Concept in linguistics

In linguistics, switch-reference (sr) describes any clause-level morpheme that signals whether certain prominent arguments in 'adjacent' clauses are coreferential. In most cases, it marks whether the subject of the verb in one clause is coreferent with that of the previous clause, or of a subordinate clause to the matrix (main) clause that is dominating it.

== Meanings of switch-reference ==
The basic distinction made by a switch-reference system is whether the following clause has the same subject (SS) or a different subject (DS). That is known as canonical switch-reference. For purposes of switch-reference, subject is defined as it is for languages with a nominative–accusative alignment: a subject is the sole argument of an intransitive clause or the agent of a transitive one. It holds even in languages with a high degree of ergativity.

The Washo language of California and Nevada exhibits a switch-reference system. When the subject of one verb is the same as the subject of the following verb, the verb takes no switch-reference marker. However, if the subject of one verb differs from the subject of the following verb, the verb takes the "different subject" marker, -š: as displayed below

yá·saʼ duléʼšugi yá·saʼ gedumbéc̓edášaʼi
again he.is.reaching.toward.him again he.is.going.to.poke.him
"Again he is reaching toward him, again he will poke him" (same subject)

mémluyi -š lémehi
you.eat -DS I.will.drink
"If you eat, I will drink" (different subjects)

The Seri language of northwestern Mexico also has a switch-reference system which is similar in most ways to those of other languages except for one very salient fact: the relevant argument in a passive clause is not the superficial subject of the passive verb but rather the always unexpressed underlying subject. In clauses with subject raising, it is the raised subject that is relevant.

== Principles of switch-reference systems ==
There are four fundamental properties that any switch reference system, canonical and non-canonical, should satisfy. Any system that does not have all these properties are categorically not switch reference:

- Switch reference systems have switch reference markers that track a specific, generalized role, are morphologically marked, and apply at the clause level.
- Switch reference systems have at least one marker indicating coreference and at least one marker indicating disjoint-reference.
- Switch reference markers encode mutually exclusive values whose semantics include identity versus non-identity, and prototypically indicate coreference or disjoint reference across clauses.
- The semantics of the predicate in the controlling clause do not constrain the use of switch reference.

=== Canonical switch-reference ===
A commonly used definition of canonical switch reference is that "switch-reference is an inflectional category of the verb, which indicates whether or not its subject is identical with the subject of some other verb." There are several formal properties that apply specifically to canonical switch reference systems. They include:

- Canonical switch-reference markers are mostly inflectional affixes on verbs. They can sometimes be separate from the verb, typically at clause boundaries, and for coordinations.
- Canonical switch-reference markers are in paradigmatic opposition. Same subject and different subject clauses are thought of as counterparts in discourse, so both of their verbs can have different morphology and can be found in different slots. Some languages allow both same subject and different subject marking on a single verb, and the clause structure could also differ between the two.
- Switch-reference markers are monomorphemic, but can also be expressed as a combination of morphemes rather than a single affix. For instance, same subject and different subject markers are often portmanteau with other markers. In Kiowa, the same subject marker gɔ̀ is also used as a nominal coordinator.
- Switch-reference pivots are generally subjects, but can also be non-subjects as determined by syntactic (e.g. subject/object), semantic (e.g. agent/patient) or discourse-based (e.g. topic) salience. Different markers can use different criteria in selection
- Switch-reference is obligatorily marked regardless of the person, number, and gender features of the switch reference pivots. Switch reference is used even in cases where the interpretation of two subjects is evident. This rule is a differentiating factor between switch reference and other similar systems such as logophoricity.
- Syntactic dependency exists between the clause that hosts the switch-reference marker, and the clauses containing the switch reference pivots. If the marked clause is a chain clause, the control clause is the immediately adjacent clause. If the switch-reference marker is used in a subordinate clause, then the control clause is the matrix clause. There are sometimes intervening clauses (clause-skipping), and occasionally the control clause is not overt. As well, sometimes switch reference markers can be suffixed to coordinators of independent clauses.

=== Non-canonical switch-reference ===
Many languages exhibit non-canonical switch-reference, the co-referents of arguments other than the subject being marked by switch-reference. Here is an example from Kiowa:

Kathryn gʲà kwút gɔ Esther-àl gʲà kwút
Kathryn 'she-it' write.PFV and.SS Esther-too 'she-it' write.PFV
Kathryn wrote a letter and Esther wrote one, too.

In this case, the use of the same-subject marker gɔ rather than the switch-reference marker nɔ indicates that the two subjects wrote letters at the same time, to the same person, and with the same subject.

In addition, the nominative subject is not always marked by switch-reference. For instance, many clauses, including those with impersonal or weather verbs, have no subject at all but can both bear and trigger switch-reference.

== Form of switch-reference markers ==
Switch-reference markers often carry additional meanings or are at least fused with connectives that carry them. For instance, a switch-reference marker might mark a different subject and sequential events.

Switch-reference markers often appear attached to verbs, but they are not a verbal category. They often appear attached to sentence-initial particles, sentence-initial recapitulative verbs, adverbial conjunctions ('when', 'because', etc.), or coordinators ('and' or 'but' though it seems never 'or'), relativizers ('which,'that'), or sentence complementizers ('that'). They can also appear as free morphemes or as differing agreement paradigms. However, most switch-reference languages are subject–object–verb languages, with verbs as well as complementizers and conjunctions coming at the end of clauses. Therefore, switch-reference often appears attached to verbs, a fact that has led to the common but erroneous claim that switch-reference is a verbal category.

One certain typological fact about switch-reference is that switch-reference markers appear at the 'edges' of clauses. It is found at the edge of either a subordinate clause (referring to the matrix clause) or at the edge of a coordinate clause (referring to the previous clause). It is also very common in clause-chaining languages of New Guinea, where it is found at the edge of medial clauses.

Switch-reference is also sensitive to syntactic structure. It can skip a clause that is string-adjacent (spoken one right after another) and refer to a matrix clause. For instance, in the configuration [A[B][C]], for which B and C are subordinate clauses to A, any switch-reference-marking on C refers to A, not B.

== Different perspectives ==
Switch-reference is accounted for by many different explanations. These are some of the current theories:

=== Switch-reference as binding ===
Finer’s account of switch-reference is connected to a generalized version of Chomsky’s binding theory that also accounts for Ā-positions (non-argument positions). Switch-reference markers occupy the head of the complementizer phrase (CP), which is an Ā-position. Same subject markers are Ā-anaphors (reflexives and reciprocals) and different subject markers are Ā-pronominals (pronouns that are not reflexives or reciprocals). That is, same subject marking is used when the indices are identical, and different subject marking is used otherwise. Since the switch-reference markers are complementizer heads, their domain (smallest XP with a subject) necessarily includes the subject of the higher clause, which can then be (non-)coreferent with the switch-reference marker.

Déchaine & Wiltshko (2002) propose an explanation of switch-reference based on the DP/ΦP distinction (ΦP is their proposed intermediate projection between NP and DP that should be able to act like either of their distributions). Déchaine & Wiltshko note that the different subject markers are very similar to their corresponding same subject markers with some added morphology such as SS -ig vs. DS -igin in Amele.

This suggests that same subject markers are bare ΦPs and different subject markers are full DPs containing a ΦP. Since different subject markers are essentially DPs, they are subject to Principle C and so cannot be coreferent with any antecedent. This forces a different-subject reading. Additionally, switch-reference is dependent on tense. Same subject marking occurs, and only subjects act as pivots for switch-reference, because switch-reference is mediated by tense.

=== Switch-reference as event (dis)continuity ===
The distribution of same subject and different subject markers do not always align with the coreference of the two subjects. Van Gijn (2016) provides a sentence in Central Pomo where the same subject marker -hi is used despite the subjects being distinct (see thematic coherence):

ʔɑ́ mkʰe kʰčé-ʔel dó-č-hi mí-li ma ʔdí-m-ʔkʰe
1A 2A bridge-the make-SML-IDENT that-with 2PAT take.PL-across-FUT
'I will build the bridge for you and on that you'll take them (across)'

Stirling (1993) proposed that switch-reference is about the congruence of "eventualities". Referential continuity is just one aspect of this. She notes six pivots for SR systems:

- The classic referential (dis)continuity: This includes canonical switch-reference as defined by Haiman & Munro (1983) which tracks whether subjects are same or different.
- Agentivity of protagonist: When the syntactic subjects are co-referent, unexpected different subject marking may occur, but the agentivity value of that participant changes. When the syntactic subjects are not co-referent, unexpected same subject marking may occur, but the subject of the reference clause does not introduce a new agentive participant.
- Time of event
- Location of event
- Mood of the clause: Switch-reference marks the basic opposition in agreement between realized or non-realized events in some languages.
- Transition out of a cohesive sequence of events: different subject markers may be used to indicate an unexpected change in the course of events in languages such as Amele and Yankunytjatjara.

Same subject markers indicate identity while different subject markers do non-identity, where identity is about agreement between “aspects of eventualities” and non-identity is disagreement in at least one of those parameters.

=== Switch-reference as coordination height ===
Keine (2013) also notes the inconsistency in the alignment of same subject and different subject markers with their subjects that may not actually be same or different. For example, in these two Zuni sentences, different subject marking is used despite the subjects being co-referent:

Hoʼ sa-kʼošo-p hoʼ saʼleʼ kʼuhmo-kʼe-nna
1SG.NOM dish-wash-DS 1SG.NOM dish break-CAUS-FUT
'Whenever I wash dishes, I always break a dish'

Teʼči-p antewa-kya
arrive-DS spend.the.night-PST
'He arrived and camped [there] for the night'

Different subject marking is used in Mesa Grande Diegueño (Yuman family) as well. This is unexpected because weather verbs do not project their own subjects, so there are no actual subjects that could be co-referent.

Nya-a:lap-č /-m səcu:r-č apəsi:w
when-be.snowing-SS -DS be.cold-SS be.very.much
'When it snows, it's very cold.'

If subject reference completely explained the distribution of switch reference markers, these sentences should not occur. What Keine proposes instead is that the switch-reference markers are the different modes of spelling out the coordination. As well, switch-reference may exist clause-internally due to the coordination of low verbal projections. To note, switch reference existing clause-internally would have no issues with locality since indices and references are not being tracked across whole clauses.

Under Keine’s proposal, if two VPs are conjoined, then there is only one vP and one external argument (i.e. one subject). This subject is then semantically interpreted as the subject of both VPs. The coordination marker used in this context is the same subject marker. Two vPs, yielding two external arguments, may also be conjoined. Each one is interpreted as the subject of its respective VP. Morphological differences and semantic properties are just consequences of the tree geometry of the coordination structure.

The Amele sentences below illustrate Keine's coordination height proposal:

Same-subject marking:

Ija hu-m-ig sab j-ig-a
1SG come-SS-1SG food eat-1SG-PAST
'I came and ate the food'

Different-subject marking:

Ija ho-co-min sab ja-g-a
1SG come-DS-1SG food eat-2SG-PAST
'I came and you ate the food'

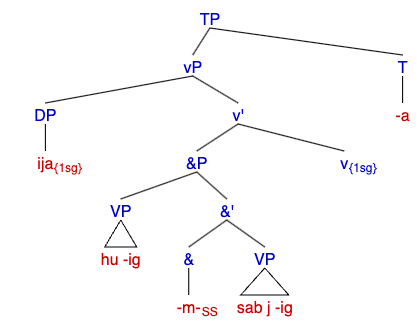

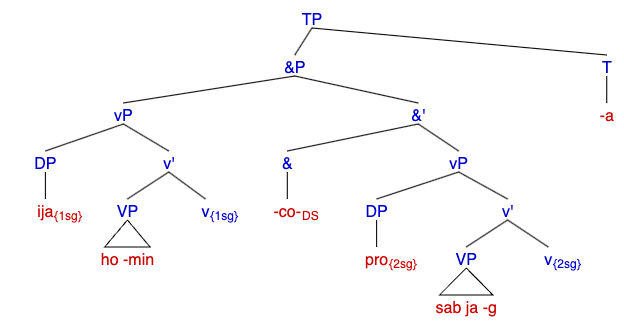

=== Switch-reference as index agreement ===
Arregi & Hanink (2021) propose that the embedded C head agrees with the subject of the embedded clause, as well as the subject of the higher clause in referential index. The same subject and different subject markers are the morphological realization of the embedded C head. If the index values of both subjects differ, or if there is feature conflict, then C is morphologically realized as -š, the different subject marker in Washo. If there is no feature conflict, then C is realized as ∅, the same subject marker in Washo. By extension, for any switch reference system, if the embedded and superordinate subjects have the same reference index, then embedded C is realized as the same subject marker. Likewise, if there is feature conflict instead, C is realized as the different subject marker.

== Distribution of switch-reference ==
Switch reference is found in hundreds of languages in North America, South America, Australia, New Guinea (particularly in the Trans-New Guinea phylum, but not in many Papuan language families of northern New Guinea). Typologies exist for North America, Australia, and New Guinea. The distribution of these systems has been determined via surveys and typological studies.

Switch-reference tends to occur in geographical clusters spread over distinct language families. This system is suspected to spread through language contact, or areal diffusion, which accounts for the fact that the morphological marking varies from one language to the next. For example, Kiowa is the only language in the Kiowa-Tanoan family that uses switch reference, which can be explained by the migration history of the Kiowa tribe and their close contact with the Crow and Comanche tribes, both of which use switch-reference in their language. Particularly in North America, the Uto-Aztecan language family is thought to have been a source of major influence.

=== Americas ===
Many indigenous languages in Western South America use switch-reference systems such as Quechuan, Uru, and Chipaya in the Andes, and Tacanan, Panoan, Barbacoan, Tucanoan, and Chicham in the Amazon area. Panoan languages are unique in the way they allow different coreference pivots such as transitive and intransitive subjects, as well as objects.

In North America, there are 11 language families and 4 isolate languages that use this system. These native languages that feature switch-reference can be found in regions stretching from the south and south-west of the U.S. to the north-west of Mexico. These include the Yuman–Cochimí, Muskogean, Maiduan, Pomoan, Yokutsan, Plateau Penutian, Yukian, Kiowa-Tanoan, Siouan-Catawban, and the Numic and Takic (subgroups of Uto-Aztecan) language families, and the Seri, Tonkawa, Washo, and Zuni isolates. These North American languages are unique in their productive use of this system, using switch-reference in coordinate, relative, and complement clauses, as well as semantically underspecified clause chains.

=== Australia and New Guinea ===
Australian languages that use switch-reference include that aboriginal language families Pama-Nyungan, Arabana-Wangganguru, Arandic, Wagaya, Garawa-Waanyi, and Djingili. Further, 70% of Papuan languages, referring to languages native to the island of New Guinea, make use of switch reference systems. While languages in Papua New Guinea are rich with personal pronouns, verbs still require switch-reference and agreement markers for participant tracking.

=== Other regions ===
Switch-reference systems are also present in languages of Vanuatu, parts of Africa, and potentially eastern Siberia. Vanuatu languages are distinctive in that they mark the anticipatory subject. Although Africa is not typically known to be a region with switch-reference, it is quite prevalent in Omotic languages, particularly within the North Omotic subgroup. This influence may have also contributed to the development of switch-reference systems in East Cushitic languages. Finally, the eastern Siberian Yukaghir language family and Even, a Tungusic language, may be considered switch-reference languages but there is currently inconclusive evidence.
