= Semantic phonology =

Theory of sign language

Semantic phonology is a model for sign language "phonology" proposed by William Stokoe (1991) It represents a notable departure from the models of the preceding 30 years, which were all based in large part on an earlier model originally called "cherology" but soon re-christened "sign language phonology". This model had also been proposed first by Stokoe.

Under this new model the parameter which under other models is analyzed as handshape is in fact the subject (or, as (Morgan 2009) argues the absolutive—i.e. subject of intransitive verbs and object of transitive verbs) and what is the parameter which is analyzed usually as movement represents the verb. Thus, even lexical signs represent full predications.

The "Semantic Phonology" model has largely been ignored by the mainstream of sign language phonology, which continue to follow a model more in "tune" with generative phonological models which grew out of the same Structuralist tradition as Stokoe's original cherology.
