= Morphosyntactic alignment =

Grammatical relationship between arguments

In linguistics, morphosyntactic alignment is the grammatical relationship between arguments—specifically, between the two arguments (in English, subject and object) of transitive verbs like the dog chased the cat, and the single argument of intransitive verbs like the cat ran away. English has a subject, which merges the more active argument of transitive verbs with the argument of intransitive verbs, leaving the object in transitive verbs distinct; other languages may have different strategies, or, rarely, make no distinction at all. Distinctions may be made morphologically (through case and agreement), syntactically (through word order), or both.

== Terminology ==
=== Dixon (1994) ===
The following notations will be used to discuss the various types of alignment:

- S (from sole), the subject of an intransitive verb;
- A (from agent), the subject of a transitive verb;
- O (from object), the object of a transitive verb. Some authors use the label P (from patient) for O.

Note that while the labels S, A, O/P originally stood for subject, agent, object, and patient, respectively, the concepts of S, A, and O/P are distinct both from the grammatical relations and thematic relations. In other words, an A or S need not be an agent or subject, and an O need not be a patient.

Note, however, that these semantic macro-roles in Dixon's model differ from those in Klimov's model (1983), which uses five macro-roles (with both S and O divided into two categories).

In a nominative–accusative system, S and A are grouped together, contrasting O. In an ergative–absolutive system, S and O are one group and contrast with A. The English language represents a typical nominative–accusative system (accusative for short). The name derived from the nominative and accusative cases. Basque is an ergative–absolutive system (or simply ergative). The name stemmed from the ergative and absolutive cases. S is said to align with either A (as in English) or O (as in Basque) when they take the same form.

==== Bickel & Nichols (2009) ====
Listed below are argument roles used by Bickel and Nichols for the description of alignment types. Their taxonomy is based on semantic roles and valency (the number of arguments controlled by a predicate).

- S, the sole argument of a one-place predicate
- A, the more agent-like arguments of a two-place (A1) or three-place (A2) predicate
- O, the less agent-like argument of a two-place predicate
- G, the more goal-like argument of a three-place predicate
- T, the non-goal-like and non-agent-like argument of a three-place predicate

=== Locus of marking ===
The term locus refers to a location where the morphosyntactic marker reflecting the syntactic relations is situated. The markers may be located on the head of a phrase, a dependent, and both or none of them.

== Types of alignment ==
1. Nominative–accusative (or accusative) alignment treats the S argument of an intransitive verb like the A argument of transitive verbs, with the O argument distinct (S = A; O separate). In a language with morphological case marking, an S and an A may both be unmarked or marked with the nominative case while the O is marked with an accusative case (or sometimes an oblique case used for dative or instrumental case roles also), as occurs with nominative -us and accusative -um in Latin: Julius venit "Julius came"; Julius Brutum vidit "Julius saw Brutus". Languages with nominative–accusative alignment can detransitivize transitive verbs by demoting the A argument and promoting the O to be an S (thus taking nominative case marking); it is called the passive voice. Most of the world's languages have accusative alignment.
  An uncommon subtype is called marked nominative. In such languages, the subject of a verb is marked for nominative case, but the object is unmarked, as are citation forms and objects of prepositions. Such alignments are clearly documented only in northeastern Africa, particularly in the Cushitic languages, and the southwestern United States and adjacent parts of Mexico, in the Yuman languages.
2. Ergative–absolutive (or ergative) alignment treats an intransitive argument like a transitive O argument (S = O; A separate). An A may be marked with an ergative case (or sometimes an oblique case used also for the genitive or instrumental case roles) while the S argument of an intransitive verb and the O argument of a transitive verb are left unmarked or sometimes marked with an absolutive case. Ergative–absolutive languages can detransitivize transitive verbs by demoting the O and promoting the A to an S, thus taking the absolutive case, called the antipassive voice. About a sixth of the world's languages have ergative alignment. The best known are probably the Inuit languages and Basque.
3. Active–stative alignment treats the arguments of intransitive verbs like the A argument of transitives (like English) in some cases and like transitive O arguments (like Inuit) in other cases (S_{a}=A; S_{o}=O). For example, in Georgian, Mariamma imğera "Mary (-ma) sang", Mariam shares the same narrative case ending as in the transitive clause Mariamma c'erili dac'era "Mary (-ma) wrote the letter (-i)", while in Mariami iq'o Tbilisši revolutsiamde "Mary (-i) was in Tbilisi up to the revolution", Mariam shares the same case ending (-i) as the object of the transitive clause. Thus, the arguments of intransitive verbs are not uniform in its behaviour.
  The reasons for treating intransitive arguments like A or like O usually have a semantic basis. The particular criteria vary from language to language and may be either fixed for each verb or chosen by the speaker according to the degree of volition, control, or suffering of the participant or to the degree of sympathy that the speaker has for the participant.
4. Symmetrical voice, also called Austronesian alignment and Philippine-type alignment, is found in the Austronesian languages of the Philippines, parts of Borneo and Sulawesi, Taiwan, and Madagascar. These languages have both accusative-type and ergative-type alignments in transitive verbs. They are traditionally (and misleadingly) called "active" and "passive" voice because the speaker can choose to use either one rather like active and passive voice in English. However, because they are not true voice, terms such as "agent trigger" or "actor focus" are increasingly used for the accusative type (S=A) and "patient trigger" or "undergoer focus" for the ergative type (S=O). (The terms with "trigger" may be preferred over those with "focus" because these are not focus systems either; morphological alignment has a long history of confused terminology). Patient-trigger alignment is the default in most of these languages. For either alignment, two core cases are used (unlike passive and antipassive voice, which have only one), but the same morphology is used for the "nominative" of the agent-trigger alignment and the "absolutive" of the patient-trigger alignment so there is a total of just three core cases: common S/A/O (usually called nominative, or less ambiguously direct), ergative A, and accusative O. Many of these languages have four alignments, with additional "voices" that mark a locative or benefactive with the direct case.
5. Direct alignment: very few languages make no distinction among agent, patient, and intransitive arguments, leaving the hearer to rely entirely on context to figure them out. This S/A/O case is called direct, as it sometimes is in Austronesian alignment.
6. Tripartite alignment uses a separate case or syntax for each argument, which are conventionally called the accusative case, the intransitive case, and the ergative case. The Nez Perce language is a notable example.
7. Transitive alignment: certain Iranian languages, such as Rushani, distinguish only transitivity (in the past tense), using a transitive case for both A and O, and an intransitive case for S. That is sometimes called a double-oblique system, as the transitive case is equivalent to the accusative in the non-past tense.

The direct, tripartite, and transitive alignment types are all quite rare. The alignment types other than Austronesian alignment can be shown graphically like this:

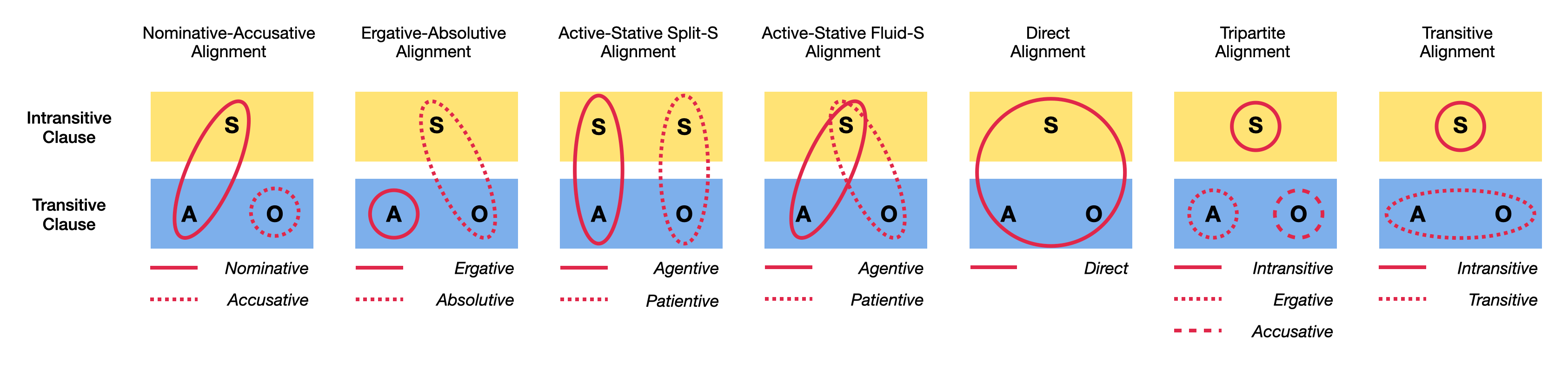

In addition, in some languages, both nominative–accusative and ergative–absolutive systems may be used, split between different grammatical contexts, called split ergativity. The split may sometimes be linked to animacy, as in many Australian Aboriginal languages, or to aspect, as in Hindustani and Mayan languages. A few Australian languages, such as Diyari, are split among accusative, ergative, and tripartite alignment, depending on animacy.

A popular idea, introduced in Anderson (1976), is that some constructions universally favor accusative alignment while others are more flexible. In general, behavioral constructions (control, raising, relativization) are claimed to favor nominative–accusative alignment while coding constructions (especially case constructions) do not show any alignment preferences. This idea underlies early notions of ‘deep’ vs. ‘surface’ (or ‘syntactic’ vs. ‘morphological’) ergativity (e.g. Comrie 1978; Dixon 1994): many languages have surface ergativity only (ergative alignments only in their coding constructions, like case or agreement) but not in their behavioral constructions or at least not in all of them. Languages with deep ergativity (with ergative alignment in behavioral constructions) appear to be less common.

== Comparison between ergative–absolutive and nominative–accusative ==
The arguments can be symbolized as follows:

- O = most patient-like argument of a transitive clause (also symbolized as P)
- S = sole argument of an intransitive clause
- A = most agent-like argument of a transitive clause

The S/A/O terminology avoids the use of terms like "subject" and "object", which are not stable concepts from language to language. Moreover, it avoids the terms "agent" and "patient", which are semantic roles that do not correspond consistently to particular arguments. For instance, the A might be an experiencer or a source, semantically, not just an agent.

The relationship between ergative and accusative systems can be schematically represented as the following:

	Ergative–absolutive	Nominative–accusative
O	same	different
S	same	same
A	different	same

The following Basque examples demonstrate ergative–absolutive case marking system:

Ergative Language

gizona-∅ {etorri da}
the.man-ABS {has arrived}
S VERB_{intrans}
'The man has arrived.'

gizona-k mutila-∅ {ikusi du}
the.man-ERG boy-ABS saw
A O VERB_{trans}
'The man saw the boy.'

In Basque, gizona is "the man" and mutila is "the boy". In a sentence like mutila gizonak ikusi du, you know who is seeing whom because -k is added to the one doing the seeing. So the sentence means "the man saw the boy". If you want to say "the boy saw the man", add the -k instead to the word meaning "the boy": mutilak gizona ikusi du.

With a verb like etorri, "come", there's no need to distinguish "who is doing the coming", so no -k is added. "The boy came" is mutila etorri da.

Japanese – by contrast – marks nouns by following them with different particles which indicate their function in the sentence:

Accusative Language

{kodomo ga} tsuita
{child NOM} arrived
S VERB_{intrans}
'The child arrived.'

{otoko ga} {kodomo o} mita
{man NOM} {child ACC} saw
A O VERB_{trans}
'The man saw the child.'

In this language, in the sentence "the man saw the child", the one doing the seeing ("man") may be marked with ga, which works like Basque -k (and the one who is being seen may be marked with o). However, in sentences like "the child arrived" ga can still be used even though the situation involves only a "doer" and not a "done-to". This is unlike Basque, where -k is completely forbidden in such sentences.

== See also ==
- Active–stative alignment
- Agreement (linguistics)
- Differential argument marking
- Differential object marking
- Labile verb
- Milewski's typology
