= Ergative–absolutive alignment =

Pattern relating to the subject and object of verbs

In ergative languages, the subject (S) of an intransitive verb shares similarities with the object (O) of a transitive verb, and not with the agent (A) of a transitive verb.

In linguistic typology, ergative–absolutive alignment is a type of morphosyntactic alignment in which the subject of an intransitive verb behaves like the object of a transitive verb, and differently from the agent (Note: This article uses the linguistic term "agent" to refer to the subject of transitive verbs, because the concept of a "subject" reflects the morphosyntactic alignment of English.) of a transitive verb. In ergative–absolutive languages with grammatical case, the ergative case refers to the marking of agents of transitive verbs, distinguishing it from the concept of a "subject" of a transitive or intransitive verb in English. The case for the single argument of an intransitive verb and the object of a transitive verb is called the absolutive.

The ergative–absolutive alignment is in contrast to nominative–accusative alignment, which is observed in English, where the single argument of an intransitive verb behaves grammatically like the agent of a transitive verb but different from the object of a transitive verb.

By one measure, 17% of the world's languages use an ergative alignment in the marking of noun phrases. Examples of ergative–absolutive languages include Basque, Georgian, Mayan, Tibetan, Sumerian, certain Indo-European languages such as Pashto, the Kurdish languages and many others.

== Ergative vs. accusative languages ==
An ergative language maintains a syntactic or morphological equivalence (such as the same word order or grammatical case) for the object of a transitive verb and the single core argument of an intransitive verb, while treating the agent of a transitive verb differently. Such languages are said to operate with S/O syntactic pivot.

This contrasts with nominative–accusative languages such as English, where the single argument of an intransitive verb and the agent of a transitive verb (both called the subject) are treated alike and kept distinct from the object of a transitive verb. Such languages are said to operate with S/A (syntactic) pivot.

Ergative alignment (intransitive Subject and transitive Object treated the same way) displaying S/O pivot

Accusative alignment (intransitive Subject and transitive Agent treated the same way) displaying S/A pivot

(reference for figure:)

These different arguments are usually symbolized as follows:

- A = agent of transitive verb ("The dog sees the cat")
- O = object of transitive verb, also symbolized as P for "patient" ("The dog sees the cat")
- S = core argument (i.e. subject) of intransitive verb ("The dog sees")

The relationship between ergative and accusative systems can be schematically represented as the following:

	Ergative–absolutive	Nominative–accusative
A	ERG	NOM
O	ABS	ACC
S	ABS	NOM

See morphosyntactic alignment for a more technical explanation and a comparison with nominative–accusative languages.

The word subject, as it is typically defined in grammars of nominative–accusative languages, has a different application when referring to ergative–absolutive languages, or when discussing morphosyntactic alignment in general.

Ergative languages tend to be either verb-final or verb-initial; there are few, if any, ergative SVO languages.

== Example comparing Latin and Dyirbal ==
Latin and Dyirbal are both languages which use case markings. Latin, however, has a nominative–accusative system, while Dyirbal has an ergative–absolutive one.

Latin Example

Because nominative–accusative systems align the subject of an intransitive verb with the subject of a transitive verb, the subjects in Latin are marked with the nominative case marker "-us" for both transitive and intransitive verbs. Similarly, the object is always marked with the accusative marker "-um".

Intransitive Latin Sentences
domin-us	venit
master-NOM	comes
"The master comes"
serv-us	venit
slave-NOM	comes
"The slave comes"

Transitive Latin Sentences
domin-us	serv-um	audit
master-NOM	slave-ACC	hears
"The master hears the slave"
serv-us	domin-um	audit
slave-NOM	master-ACC	hears
"The slave hears the master"

The sole subject shares a morpheme with the transitive subject, while the object has a separate morpheme

Dyirbal Example

Dyirbal in contrast, uses an ergative–absolutive system. In Dyirbal, a noun has no affixes when it is the sole subject of an intransitive verb as well as when it is the object of a transitive verb. Only transitive subjects have a case marking "-ŋgu". The fact that the case marking for the subject of an intransitive verb differs from the marking on subjects of a transitive verb is the key difference of ergative–absolutive languages.

Intransitive Dyirbal Sentences
ŋuma-∅	banagan^{y}u
father-ABS	returned
"father returned"
yabu-∅	banagan^{y}u
mother-ABS	returned
"mother returned"

Transitive Dyirbal Sentences
yabu-ŋgu	ŋuma-∅	buran
mother-ERG	father-ABS	saw
"mother saw father"
ŋuma-ŋgu	yabu-∅	buran
father-ERG	mother-ABS	saw
"father saw mother"

The sole subject shares a morpheme with the object, while the transitive subject has a separate morpheme

With an intransitive verb, the subject does not get an affix in Dyirbal. While with a transitive verb, it is the object that does not get an affix.

== Realization of ergativity ==
Ergativity can be found in both morphological and syntactic behavior. All known ergative languages show ergativity in their morphology, and a small portion also show ergativity in their syntax.

=== Morphological ergativity ===
If the language has morphological case, then the verb arguments are marked thus:

- The agent of a transitive verb (A) is marked as ergative case, or as a similar case such as oblique.
- The core argument of an intransitive verb (S) and the object of a transitive verb (O) are both marked with absolutive case.

If there is no case marking, ergativity can be marked through other means, such as in verbal morphology. For instance, Abkhaz and most Mayan languages have no morphological ergative case, but they have a verbal agreement structure that is ergative. In languages with ergative–absolutive agreement systems, the absolutive form is usually the most unmarked form of a word (exceptions include Nias and Tlapanec).

==== Basque ====
The following examples from Basque demonstrate an ergative–absolutive case marking system:

Ergative language
Sentence:	Martin etorri da.		Martinek Diego ikusi du.		
Word:	Martin-Ø	etorri da	Martin-ek	Diego-Ø	ikusi du
Gloss:	Martin-ABS	has arrived	Martin-ERG	Diego-ABS	has seen
Function:	S	VERB_{intrans}	A	O	VERB_{trans}
Translation:	"Martin has arrived."		"Martin has seen Diego."		

Here -Ø represents a zero morpheme, as the absolutive case is unmarked in Basque with proper nouns (i.e., Martin, Diego, Berlin...). The forms for the ergative are -k after a vowel, and -ek after a consonant. It is a further rule in Basque grammar that in most cases a noun phrase must be closed by a determiner. The default determiner (commonly called the article, which is suffixed to common nouns and usually translatable by "the" in English) is -a in the singular and -ak in the plural, the plural being marked only on the determiner and never the noun. For common nouns, this default determiner is fused with the ergative case marker. Thus one obtains the following forms for gizon ("man"): gizon-a (man-the.sing.abs), gizon-ak (man-the.pl.abs), gizon-ak (man-the.sing.erg), gizon-ek (man-the.pl.erg). When fused with the article, the absolutive plural is homophonous with the ergative singular. See Basque grammar for details.

==== Georgian ====
Georgian has an ergative alignment, but the agent is only marked with the ergative case in the perfective aspect (also known as the "aorist screeve"). Thus exhibiting a form of split ergativity. Compare:

K'aci vašls č'ams. (კაცი ვაშლს ჭამს) "The man is eating an apple."
K'acma vašli č'ama. (კაცმა ვაშლი ჭამა) "The man ate an apple."

K'ac- is the root of the word "man". In the first sentence (present continuous tense) the agent is in the nominative case (k'aci ). In the second sentence, which shows ergative alignment, the root is marked with the ergative suffix -ma.

However, there are some intransitive verbs in Georgian that behave like transitive verbs, and therefore employ the ergative case in the past tense. Consider:

K'acma daacemina. (კაცმა დააცემინა) "The man sneezed."

Although the verb "sneeze" is clearly intransitive, it is conjugated like a transitive verb. In Georgian there are a few verbs like these, and there has not been a clear-cut explanation as to why these verbs have evolved this way. One explanation is that verbs such as "sneeze" used to have a direct object (the object being "nose" in the case of "sneeze") and over time lost these objects, yet kept their transitive behavior.

==== Differing noun-pronoun alignment ====
In rare cases, such as the Australian Aboriginal language Nhanda, different nominal elements may follow a different case-alignment template. In Nhanda, common nouns have ergative–absolutive alignment—like in most Australian languages—but most pronouns instead follow a nominative–accusative template. In Nhanda, the absolutive case has a null suffix while ergative case is marked with some allomorph of the suffixes -nggu or -lu. See the common noun paradigm at play below:

Intransitive Subject (ABS)

pundu yatka-yu
rain.ABS go-ABL.NFUT
Rain is coming.

Transitive Subject-Object (ERG-ABS)

nyarlu-nggu yawarda nha-'i
woman-ERG kangaroo.ABS see-PAST
The woman saw the kangaroo

Compare the above examples with the case marking of pronouns in Nhanda below, wherein all subjects (regardless of verb transitivity) are marked (in this case with a null suffix) the same for case while transitive objects take the accusative suffix -nha.

Intransitive Pronoun Subject (NOM)

wandha-ra-nyja yatka-ndha?
Where-3.OBL-2SG.NOM go-NPAST
Where are you going?

Transitive Pronoun Subject-Object (NOM-ACC)

nyini nha-'i ngayi-nha
2.NOM see-PST 1-ACC
You saw me

=== Syntactic ergativity ===
Ergativity may be manifested through syntax in addition to morphology. While all known ergative languages show ergativity in their morphology, only a small portion also show ergativity in their syntax. As with morphology, syntactic ergativity can be placed on a continuum, whereby certain syntactic operations may pattern accusatively and others ergatively. The degree of syntactic ergativity is then dependent on the number of syntactic operations that treat the subject like the object. Syntactic ergativity is also referred to as inter-clausal ergativity, as it typically appears in the relation of two clauses.

Syntactic ergativity may appear in:

- Word order (for example, the absolutive argument comes before the verb and the ergative argument comes after it)
- Syntactic pivots
- Relative clauses – determining which arguments are available for relativization
- Subordination
- Switch reference

==== Example ====
Example of syntactic ergativity in the "conjunction reduction" construction (coordinated clauses) in Dyirbal in contrast with English conjunction reduction. (The subscript (i) indicates coreference.)

English (SVO word order):

1. Father returned.
2. Father saw mother.
3. Mother saw father.
4. Father_{(i)} returned and father_{(i)} saw mother.
5. Father_{(i)} returned and _____{(i)} saw mother.
6. Father_{(i)} returned and mother saw father_{(i)}.
7. * Father_{(i)} returned and mother saw _____{(i)}. (ill-formed, because S and deleted O cannot be coreferential.)

Dyirbal (OSV word order):

1. Ŋuma banagan^{y}u. (Father returned.)
2. Yabu ŋumaŋgu buṛan. (lit. Mother father-ŋgu saw, i.e. Father saw mother.)
3. Ŋuma yabuŋgu buṛan. (lit. Father mother-ŋgu saw, i.e. Mother saw father.)
4. Ŋuma_{(i)} banagan^{y}u, yabu ŋumaŋgu_{(i)} buṛan. (lit. Father_{(i)} returned, mother father-ŋgu_{(i)} saw, i.e. Father returned, father saw mother.)
5. * Ŋuma_{(i)} banagan^{y}u, yabu _____{(i)} buṛan. (lit. *Father_{(i)} returned, mother _____{(i)} saw; ill-formed, because S and deleted A cannot be coreferential.)
6. Ŋuma_{(i)} banagan^{y}u, ŋuma_{(i)} yabuŋgu buṛan. (lit. Father_{(i)} returned, father_{(i)} mother-ŋgu saw, i.e. Father returned, mother saw father.)
7. Ŋuma_{(i)} banagan^{y}u, _____{(i)} yabuŋgu buṛan. (lit. Father_{(i)} returned, _____{(i)} mother-ŋgu saw, i.e. Father returned, mother saw father.)

Crucially, the fifth sentence has an S/A pivot and thus is ill-formed in Dyirbal (syntactically ergative); on the other hand, the seventh sentence has an S/O pivot and thus is ill-formed in English (syntactically accusative).

Father returned.
father	returned
S	VERB_{intrans}

Father returned, and father saw mother.
father	returned	and	father	saw	mother
S	VERB_{intrans}	CONJ	A	VERB_{trans}	O

Father returned and saw mother.
father	returned	and	____	saw	mother
S	VERB_{intrans}	CONJ	A	VERB_{trans}	O

Ŋuma banagan^{y}u.
ŋuma-∅	banagan^{y}u
father-ABS	returned
S	VERB_{intrans}
"Father returned."

Yabu ŋumaŋgu buṛan.
yabu-∅	ŋuma-ŋgu	buṛan
mother-ABS	father-ERG	saw
O	A	VERB_{trans}
"Father saw mother."

Ŋuma yabuŋgu buṛan.
ŋuma-∅	yabu-ŋgu	buṛan
father-ABS	mother-ERG	saw
O	A	VERB_{trans}
"Mother saw father."

Ŋuma banagan^{y}u, ŋuma yabuŋgu buṛan.
ŋuma-∅	banagan^{y}u	ŋuma-∅	yabu-ŋgu	buṛan
father-ABS	returned	father-ABS	mother-ERG	saw
S	VERB_{intrans}	O	A	VERB_{trans}
"Father returned and mother saw father."

Ŋuma banagan^{y}u, yabuŋgu buṛan.
ŋuma-∅	banagan^{y}u	____	yabu-ŋgu	buṛan
father-ABS	returned	(deleted)	mother-ERG	saw
S	VERB_{intrans}	O	A	VERB_{trans}
"Father returned and was seen by mother."

=== Split ergativity ===
Few ergative languages are purely ergative. Many ergative systems have parts of their grammar which do not maintain an ergative pattern, a phenomenon known as split ergativity. Some linguists have claimed that all ergative languages have split ergativity. The two main areas of grammar that often exhibit a split in ergativity are grammatical person and grammatical aspect. In both, cross-linguistic patterns have been observed which make the split of ergativity more predicable.

With grammatical person, a directional hierarchy has been observed cross-linguistically which constricts which grammatical persons may exhibit ergativity in the same language. In languages following this pattern of split ergativity, there will be a particular point on the hierarchy in which everything to the left will exhibit ergativity, and everything to the right will not. For example, Dyirbal has split ergativity on grammatical person and divides the hierarchy at the point of 1st/2nd person pronouns. 1st/2nd person pronouns use an accusative pattern, and everything to the left of it on the spectrum follows an ergative pattern.

Directionality of splits on grammatical person
Ergative	common nouns	proper nouns	demonstratives, 3rd person pronouns	1st/2nd person pronouns	Non-Ergative

The same principle has been observed with grammatical aspect. The directionality hierarchy is as follows:

Directionality of splits on grammatical aspect
Ergative	perfective	imperfective	progressive	non-ergative

==== In Hindustani ====
In Hindustani (Hindi and Urdu), the ergative case is marked on agents in the perfective aspect for transitive and ditransitive verbs (also for intransitive verbs when they are volitional), while in other situations agents appear in the nominative case.

laṛkā kitāb xarīdtā hai.
boy:MASC.SG.NOM book:FEM.SG-NOM buy:HAB.MASC.SG be:3P.SG.PRS
'The boy buys a book'

laṛke-ne kitāb xarīdī hai.
boy:MASC.SG.ERG book:FEM.SG-NOM buy:PRF.FEM.SG be:3P.SG.PRS
'The boy has bought a book'

laṛkā khā̃sā.
boy:MASC.SG.NOM cough:PRF.MASC.SG
'The boy coughed.'

laṛke-ne khā̃sā.
boy:MASC.SG.ERG cough:PRF.MASC.SG
'The boy coughed (intentionally).'

=== Optional ergativity ===
Many languages with ergative marking display what is known as optional ergativity, where the ergative marking is not always expressed in all situations. McGregor (2010) gives a range of contexts when we often see optional ergativity, and argues that the choice is often not truly optional but is affected by semantics and pragmatics. Unlike split ergativity, which occurs regularly but in limited locations, optional ergativity can occur in a range of environments, but may not be used in a way that appears regular or consistent.

Optional ergativity may be motivated by:

- The animacy of the subject, with more animate subjects more likely to be marked ergative
- The semantics of the verb, with more active or transitive verbs more likely to be marked ergative
- The grammatical structure or [tense-aspect-mood]

Languages from Australia, New Guinea and Tibet have been shown to have optional ergativity.

== Distribution of ergative languages ==
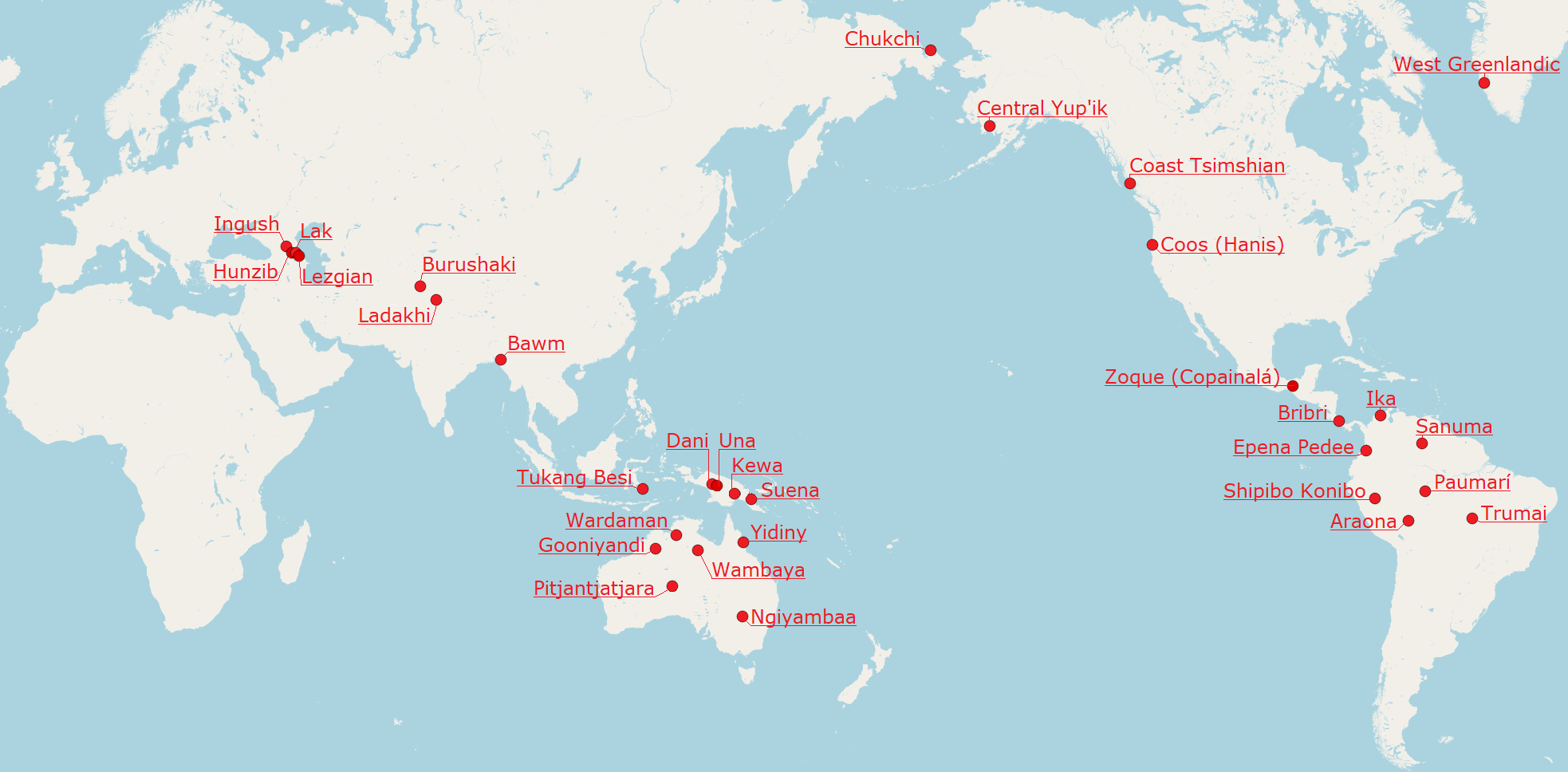
A world map indicating the geographic position of 32 Ergative–absolutive languages among a sample of 190.

A World Atlas of Language Structures (WALS) sample of 190 languages found 32 (17%) of languages use an ergative alignment in the marking of noun phrases. Prototypical ergative languages are, for the most part, restricted to specific regions of the world: Mesopotamia (Kurdish, and some extinct languages), the Caucasus, the Americas, the Tibetan Plateau, and Australia and parts of New Guinea.

Specific languages and language families include:

=== Americas ===
- Chibchan languages
- Chinookan languages (extinct)
- Coosan languages (extinct)
- Eskimo–Aleut languages
- Guaicuruan languages
- Macro-Jê languages
- Mayan
- Mixe–Zoque
- Panoan languages
- Salish languages
- Tsimshian

=== Africa ===
- Tedaga, a Nilo-Saharan language of Southern Libya and Northern Chad.
- Majang language, a Nilo-Saharan language of Ethiopia.
- Päri, although recent studies imply a nominative-accusative system.

=== Asia ===
- Assamese
- Burushaski
- Chukchi (endangered)
- Hawu
- Tibetan
- Sylheti
- Yaghnobi
- Pashto

=== Australian ===
- Most Australian Aboriginal languages, such as Dyirbal

Certain Australian Aboriginal languages (e.g., Wangkumara) possess an intransitive case and an accusative case along with an ergative case, and lack an absolutive case; such languages are called tripartite languages or ergative–accusative languages.

=== Pacific ===
- Proto-Polynesian (disputed)
- Samoan
- Tongan

=== Papua ===
- Eastern Trans-Fly languages
- various Trans–New Guinea languages

=== Europe ===
- Basque

=== Caucasus and Near East ===
- Hurrian (extinct)
- Urartian (extinct)
- Sumerian (extinct)
- South Caucasian: Georgian, Laz
- Northeast Caucasian: Chechen, Lezgian, Tsez, Archi (endangered)
- Northwest Caucasian: Abkhaz, Circassian, Ubykh (extinct)
- Kurdish: Sorani and Kurmanji
- Gorani
- Zaza
- Proto-Indo-European (disputed)

=== Languages with limited ergativity ===
- In Hindi (Indo-Aryan), ergative alignment occurs only when the verb is in the perfective aspect for transitive verbs (also for intransitive verbs but only when they are volitional).
- In Pashto, ergative alignment occurs only in the past tense.
- In Georgian, ergativity only occurs in the perfective.
- The Philippine languages (e.g., Tagalog) are sometimes considered ergative (Schachter 1976, 1977; Kroeger 1993); however, they have also been considered to have their own unique morphosyntactic alignment. See symmetrical voice.
- In the Neo-Aramaic languages, which are generally classified into four groups, only Northeastern (NENA) and Ṭuroyo groups exhibit split ergativity, which is formed in the perfective aspect only, whereas the imperfective aspect is nominative–accusative. Some dialects would only mark unaccusative subjects as ergative. Assyrian Neo-Aramaic, in particular, has an ergative type of construction of the perfective past verbal base, where foregone actions are verbalized by a passive construction with the patient being conferred as the grammatical subject rather than by an active construction, e.g. baxta qtile ("the woman was killed by him"). The ergative type of inflection with an agentive phrase has been extended by analogy to intransitive verbs, e.g. qim-le ("he has risen"). Aramaic has historically been a nominative–accusative language.

=== Sign languages ===
Sign languages (for example, Nepali Sign Language) should also generally be considered ergative in the patterning of actant incorporation in verbs. In sign languages that have been studied, classifier handshapes are incorporated into verbs, indicating the subject of intransitive verbs when incorporated, and the object of transitive verbs. (If we follow the "semantic phonology" model proposed by William Stokoe (1991) this ergative–absolutive patterning also works at the level of the lexicon: thus in Nepali Sign Language the sign for TEA has the motion for the verb DRINK with a manual alphabet handshape च /ca/ (standing for the first letter of the Nepali word TEA चिया /chiya:/) being incorporated as the object.)

== Approximations of ergativity in English ==
English has a number of so-called ergative verbs, for which the object of the verb when transitive is equivalent to the subject of the verb when intransitive.

When English nominalizes a clause, the underlying subject of an intransitive verb and the underlying object of a transitive verb are both marked with the possessive case or with the preposition "of". The underlying subject of a transitive is marked differently (typically with "by" as in a passive construction):

"(a dentist) extracts a tooth" → "the extraction of a tooth (by a dentist)"
"(I/The editor) revised the essay" → "(my/the editor's) revision of the essay"
"(I was surprised that) the water boiled" → "(I was surprised at) the boiling of the water"
"I departed on time (so I could catch the plane)" → "My timely departure (allowed me to catch the plane)"

== Emergence of Ergativity ==
Many linguists have noted grammatical similarity between ergative patterns and passives in nominative-accusative systems. In both cases, transitive subjects are more grammatically marked than objects or intransitive subjects.

There is some evidence in Australian and Polynesian languages that their ergative patterns may have historically had a relationship to passives. Some linguists have argued that all ergative patterns originally emerged from passive constructions, while others argue that ergativity can emerge in multiple ways.

In 2003, psycholinguist Goldin-Meadow found that deaf children of hearing parents have a tendency to invent ergative grammars when creating their own gesture systems to communicate. English speaking adults have a similar tendency to improvise ergative structures when asked to communicate using only their hands, despite being accustomed to an accusative pattern in spoken English. She has suggested that these tendencies may be a result of a psychological bias towards ergativity. It is an open question why ergative grammatical structures are comparatively rare across the world's languages when it has been observed they are predictably improvised. Goldin-Meadow has suggested that while an ergative pattern is intuitive, other pressures on clarity, processibility, speed, ease, and expressiveness may drive most languages to develop a non-ergative structure.

== See also ==
- Active-stative language
- Ergative verb
- Symmetrical voice (aka Austronesian alignment)
- Unaccusative verb
- Unergative verb

== Bibliography ==
- Aldridge, Edith. (2008). Generative Approaches to Ergativity. Language and Linguistics Compass, 2, 966–995.
- Aldridge, Edith. (2008). Minimalist analysis of ergativity. Sophia Linguistica, 55, 123–142.
- Aldridge, Edith. (2016). Ergativity from subjunctive in Austronesian languages. Language and Linguistics, 17(1), 27–62.
- Anderson, Stephen. (1976). On the notion of subject in ergative languages. In C. Li. (Ed.), Subject and topic (pp. 1–24). New York: Academic Press. ISBN 0-12-447350-4.
- Anderson, Stephen R. (1985). Inflectional morphology. In T. Shopen (Ed.), Language typology and syntactic description: Grammatical categories and the lexicon (Vol. 3, pp. 150–201). Cambridge: University of Cambridge Press. ISBN 0-521-58158-3.
- Comrie, Bernard. (1978). Ergativity In W. P. Lehmann (Ed.), Syntactic typology: Studies in the phenomenology of language (pp. 329–394). Austin: University of Texas Press. ISBN 0-292-77545-8.
- Coon, Jessica, Diane Massam and Lisa deMena Travis. (Eds.). (2017). The Oxford handbook of ergativity. Oxford University Press.
- Comrie, Bernard (1989 [1981]). Language Universals and Linguistic Typology, 2nd ed. University of Chicago Press.
- Dixon, R. M. W. (1979). Ergativity. Language, 55 (1), 59–138. (Revised as Dixon 1994).
- Dixon, R. M. W. (Ed.) (1987). Studies in ergativity. Amsterdam: North-Holland. ISBN 0-444-70275-X.
- Dixon, R. M. W. (1994). Ergativity. Cambridge University Press. ISBN 0-521-44898-0.
- Foley, William; & Van Valin, Robert. (1984). Functional syntax and universal grammar. Cambridge University Press. ISBN 0-521-25956-8.
- Iliev, Ivan G. (2007) On the Nature of Grammatical Case ... (Case and Vocativeness)
- Kroeger, Paul. (1993). Phrase structure and grammatical relations in Tagalog. Stanford: CSLI. ISBN 0-937073-86-5.
- Legate, Julie Anne. (2008). Morphological and Abstract Case. Linguistic Inquiry 39.1: 55–101.
- Mallinson, Graham; & Blake, Barry J. (1981). Agent and patient marking. Language typology: Cross-linguistic studies in syntax (Chap. 2, pp. 39–120). North-Holland linguistic series. Amsterdam: North-Holland Publishing Company.
- McGregor, William B. (2010). Optional ergative case marking systems in a typological-semiotic perspective. Lingua 120: 1610–1636.
- Paul, Ileana & Travis, Lisa. (2006). Ergativity in Austronesian languages: What it can do, what it can't, but not why. In A. Johns, D. Massam, & J. Ndayiragije (Eds.), Ergativity: Emerging Issues (pp. 315–335). Dordrecht, The Netherlands: Springer.
- Plank, Frans. (Ed.). (1979). Ergativity: Towards a theory of grammatical relations. London: Academic Press.
- Rude, Noel. (1983). Ergativity and the active-stative typology in Loma. Studies in African Linguistics 14 (3): 265–283.
- Schachter, Paul. (1976). The subject in Philippine languages: Actor, topic, actor-topic, or none of the above. In C. Li. (Ed.), Subject and topic (pp. 491–518). New York: Academic Press.
- Schachter, Paul. (1977). Reference-related and role-related properties of subjects. In P. Cole & J. Sadock (Eds.), Syntax and semantics: Grammatical relations (Vol. 8, pp. 279–306). New York: Academic Press. ISBN 0-12-613508-8.
- Silverstein, Michael. (1976). Hierarchy of Features and Ergativity. In R.M.W. Dixon (ed.) Grammatical Categories in Australian Languages (pp. 112–171). New Jersey: Humanities Press. ISBN 0-391-00694-0. Reprinted in Pieter Muysken and Henk van Riemsdijk (eds.), Features and Projections (pp. 163–232). Dordrecht: Foris. ISBN 90-6765-144-3.
- Suda, Junichi (2025). “The Late-Klimov Model for Typological Classification of Active, Ergative, and Nominative Languages ― Re-evaluation of the Five Macroroles Model, et al.”. Typological Studies 7: 83–109.
- Verbeke, Saartje. 2013. Alignment and ergativity in new Indo-Aryan languages. Berlin: de Gruyter.
- Vydrin, Valentin. (2011). Ergative/Absolutive and Active/Stative alignment in West Africa:The case of Southwestern Mande. Studies in Language 35 (2): 409–443.
