= Naʼvi language =

Constructed science-fiction language

Naʼvi
- Lìʼfya leNaʼvi
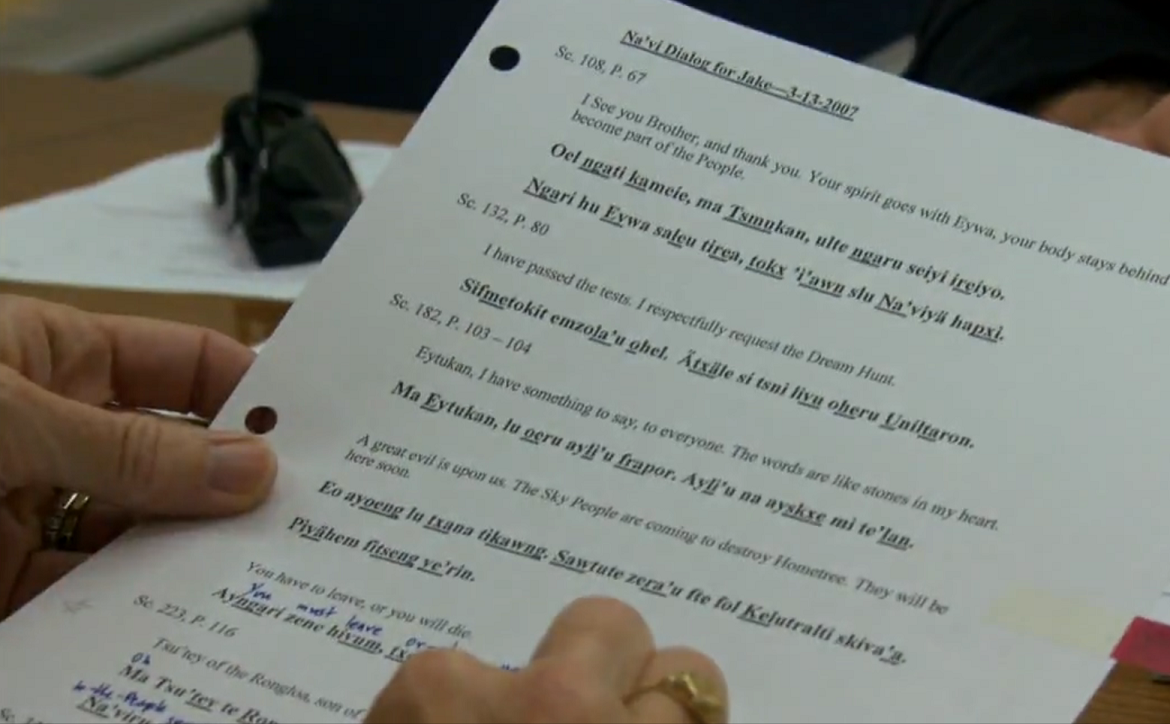
- Dialogue from Avatar spoken by Jake Sully in Naʼvi with English translations
- Pronunciation: [ˈnaʔvi]
- Created by: Paul Frommer
- Date: 2005
- Setting and usage: Avatar, Avatar: The Way of Water and Avatar: Fire and Ash
- Purpose: constructed languages: artistic languages; Naʼvi
- Writing system: none (in-universe); Latin script
- Sources: constructed languages a priori languages

Language codes
- ISO 639-3: (a proposal to use nvi was rejected in 2012)
- Linguist List: 08n
- Glottolog: None
- IETF: art-x-navi

The Naʼvi language (Lìʼfya leNaʼvi) is a constructed language originally made for the 2009 film Avatar. In the film franchise, the language is spoken by the Na'vi, a species of sapient humanoids indigenous to the extraterrestrial moon Pandora. The language was created by Paul Frommer, a professor at the USC Marshall School of Business with a doctorate in linguistics. Naʼvi was designed to fit moviemaker James Cameron's conception of what the language should sound like in the film. It had to be realistically learnable by the human characters of the film and pronounceable by the actors, but also not closely resemble any single human language.

When the film was released in 2009, Naʼvi had a growing vocabulary of about a thousand words, but understanding of its grammar was limited to the language's creator. However, this has changed subsequently as Frommer has expanded the lexicon to more than 2600 words and has published the grammar.

== Roots ==
The Naʼvi language has its origins in James Cameron's early work on Avatar. In 2005, while the film was still in scriptment form, Cameron felt it needed a complete, consistent language for the alien characters to speak. He had written approximately 30 words for this alien language but wanted a linguist to create the language in full. His production company, Lightstorm Entertainment, contacted the linguistics department at the University of Southern California (USC) seeking someone who would be interested in creating such a language. Edward Finegan, a professor of linguistics at USC, thought that the project would appeal to Paul Frommer, with whom he had co-authored a linguistics textbook, and so forwarded Lightstorm's inquiry on to him. Frommer and Cameron met to discuss the director's vision for the language and its use in the film; at the end of the meeting, Cameron shook Frommer's hand and said "Welcome aboard".

Based on Cameron's initial list of words, which had a "Polynesian flavor" according to Frommer, the linguist developed three different sets of meaningless words and phrases that conveyed a sense of what an alien language might sound like: one using contrasting tones, one using varying vowel lengths, and one using ejective consonants. Of the three, Cameron liked the sound of the ejectives most. His choice established the phonology that Frommer would use in developing the rest of the Naʼvi language – morphology, syntax, and an initial vocabulary – a task that took six months.

== Development ==
The Naʼvi vocabulary was created by Frommer as needed for the script of the movie. By the time casting for Avatar began, the language was sufficiently developed that actors were required to read and pronounce Naʼvi dialogue during auditions. During shooting Frommer worked with the cast, helping them understand their Naʼvi dialogue and advising them on their Naʼvi pronunciation, stress, and intonation. Actors would often make mistakes in speaking Naʼvi. In some cases, those mistakes were plausibly explained as ones their human characters would make while learning the language in-universe; in other cases, the mistakes were incorporated into the language.

Frommer expanded the vocabulary further in May 2009 when he worked on the Avatar video game, which required Naʼvi words that had not been needed for the film script and thus had not yet been invented. Frommer also translated into Naʼvi four sets of song lyrics that had been written by Cameron in English, and he helped vocalists with their pronunciation during the recording of James Horner's Avatar score. At the time of the film's release on December 18, 2009, the Naʼvi vocabulary consisted of approximately 1,000 words.

Work on the Naʼvi language has continued even after the film's release. Frommer is working on a compendium which he plans to deliver to Fox in the near future. He hopes that the language will "have a life of its own," and thinks it would be "wonderful" if the language developed a following. Since then, it has developed a following, as is evident through the increasing learner community of the language. The community's Lexical Expansion Project, together with Frommer, has expanded the lexicon by more than 50 percent.

Frommer also maintains a blog, Na’viteri, where he regularly posts additions to the lexicon and clarifications on grammar. Naʼviteri has been the source of the vast majority of Naʼvi growth independent of Frommer's contract with 20th Century Fox.

== Structure and usage ==
The Naʼvi language was developed under three significant constraints. First, Cameron wanted the language to sound alien but pleasant and appealing to audiences. Second, since the storyline included humans who have learned to speak the language, it had to be a language that humans could plausibly learn to speak. And finally, the actors would have to be able to pronounce their Naʼvi dialogue without unreasonable difficulty. The language in its final form contains several elements which are uncommon in human languages, such as verbal conjugation using infixes. All Naʼvi linguistic elements are found in human languages, but the combination is unique.

=== Phonology and orthography ===
Naʼvi lacks voiced plosives like [b] [d] [ɡ], but has the ejective consonants [pʼ] [tʼ] [kʼ], which are spelled px, tx, kx. It also has the syllabic consonants ll and rr. There are seven vowels, a ä e i ì o u. Although all the sounds were designed to be pronounceable by the human actors of the film, there are unusual consonant clusters, as in fngap [fŋap] "metal".

Naʼvi syllables may be as simple as a single vowel, or as complex as skxawng "moron" or fngap above (both CCVC).

The fictional language Naʼvi of Pandora is unwritten. However, the actual (studio) language is written in the Latin script for the actors of Avatar. Some words include: zìsìt "year", fpeio "ceremonial challenge", ’awve "first" (’aw "one"), muiä "fair", tireaioang "spirit animal", tskxe "rock", kllpxìltu "territory", uniltìrantokx "avatar" (dream-walk-body).

==== Vowels ====
There are seven monophthong vowels:

	front	back
High	i ⟨i⟩	u ~ ʊ ⟨u⟩
High	ɪ ⟨ì⟩	u ~ ʊ ⟨u⟩
Mid	ɛ ⟨e⟩	o ⟨o⟩
Low	æ ⟨ä⟩	a ⟨a⟩

There are additionally four diphthongs: aw [aw], ew [εw], ay [aj], ey [εj], and two syllabic consonants: ll [l̩] and rr [r̩], which mostly behave as vowels.

Note that the e is open-mid while the o is close-mid, and that there is no *oy. The rr is strongly trilled, and the ll is "light" (plain), never a "dark" (velarized) *[ɫ̩].

These vowels may occur in sequences, as in the Polynesian languages, Swahili, and Japanese. Each vowel counts as a syllable, so that tsaleioae has six syllables, [tsa.lɛ.i.o.a.e], and meoauniaea has eight, [mɛ.o.a.u.ni.a.ɛ.a].

Naʼvi does not have vowel length or tone, but it does have contrastive stress: túte "person", tuté "female person". Although stress may move with derivation, as here, it is not affected by inflection (case on nouns, tense on verbs, etc.). So, for example, the verb lu ("to be") has stress on its only vowel, the u, and no matter what else happens to it, the stress stays on that vowel: lolú "was" (l⟨ol⟩u), lolängú "was (ugh!)" (l⟨ol⟩⟨äng⟩u), etc.

==== Consonants ====
There are 20 consonants. There are two Latin transcriptions: one that more closely approaches the ideal of one letter per phoneme, with the c and g for [ts] and [ŋ] (the values they have in much of Eastern Europe and Polynesia, respectively), and a modified transcription used for the actors, with the digraphs ts and ng used for those sounds. In both transcriptions, the ejective consonants are written with digraphs in x, a convention that appears to have no external inspiration, but could potentially be inspired by the Esperanto convention of writing x as a stand-in for the circumflex.

		Labial	Alveolar	Palatal	Velar	Glottal
Nasal		m ⟨m⟩	n ⟨n⟩		ŋ ⟨ng (g)⟩	
Plosive	plain	p ⟨p⟩	t ⟨t⟩		k ⟨k⟩	ʔ ⟨ʼ⟩
Plosive	ejective	pʼ ⟨px⟩	tʼ ⟨tx⟩		kʼ ⟨kx⟩	
Affricate			ts ⟨ts (c)⟩			
Fricative	voiceless	f ⟨f⟩	s ⟨s⟩			h ⟨h⟩
Fricative	voiced	v ⟨v⟩	z ⟨z⟩			
Approximant	central	w ⟨w⟩	ɾ ⟨r⟩	j ⟨y⟩		
Approximant	lateral		l ⟨l⟩			

The fricatives and the affricate, f v ts s z h, are restricted to the onset of a syllable; the others may occur at the beginning or at the end (though w y in final position are considered parts of diphthongs, as they only occur as ay ey aw ew and may be followed by another final consonant, as in skxawng "moron"). However, in addition to appearing before vowels, f ts s may form consonant clusters with any of the unrestricted consonants (the plosives and liquids/glides) apart from ’, making for 39 clusters. Other sequences occur across syllable boundaries, such as Naʼvi [naʔ.vi] and ikran [ik.ɾan] "banshee".

The plosives p t k are tenuis, as in Spanish or French. In final position, they have no audible release, as in Indonesian and other languages of Southeast Asia, as well as in many dialects of English in words such as "bat". The r is flapped, as in Spanish and Indonesian; it sounds a bit like the tt or dd in the American pronunciation of the words latter / ladder.

==== Sound change ====
The plosives undergo lenition after certain prefixes and prepositions. The ejective consonants px tx kx become the corresponding plosives p t k; the plosives and affricate p t ts k become the corresponding fricatives f s h; and the glottal stop ’ disappears entirely. For example, the plural form of po "s/he" is ayfo "they", with the p weakening into an f after the prefix ay-. Technically:

- px (/p'/) → p
- tx (/t'/) → t
- kx (/k'/) → k
- p → f
- t or ts → s
- k → h
- ' (/ʔ/) → ∅

Conventional notation uses + to denote a prefix that causes lenition.

Lenition has its own significance when the plural prefix can optionally be omitted. In the above example, ayfo can be shortened to fo. Similarly, the plural of tsmukan "brother" can be smukan (from aysmukan).

Since Naʼvi does not make the distinction between long and short vowels, if the application of an affix results in two of the same vowels in a row, it usually is shortened to one. (Note: See exception with -ey- in the noun section) There is also some nasal assimilation of place. Specific affixes listed hereafter will list there variants. Many prefixes combine with each other to form slight variants.

=== Grammar ===
Naʼvi is a tripartite, primarily affixing agglutinative language. It has free word order. For example, the English "I see you" (a common greeting in Naʼvi) can be written as follows in Naʼvi:

Oel ngati kameie
Ngati oel kameie
Oel kameie ngati

As sentences become more complex, some words, like adjectives and negatives, will have to stay in a more or less fixed position in the sentence, depending on what the adjective or negative is describing.

"Today is a good day"
Fìtrr lu sìltsana trr
Sìltsana trr fìtrr lu

In this case, the adjective sìltsan(a) (good) will need to stay with the noun trr (day), therefore limiting the sentence to fewer combinations on the construction of the sentence, but as long as it follows or precedes the noun, the sentence is fine. By putting the attributive a before the adjective, the adjective can be put after the noun:

Fìtrr lu trr asìltsan

==== Nouns ====
Nouns in Naʼvi show greater number distinctions than those in most human languages do: besides singular and plural, they not only have special dual forms for two of an item (eyes, hands, lovers, etc.), which are common in human language (English has a remnant in "both"), but also trial forms for three of an item, which on Earth are only found with pronouns. Gender is only occasionally (and optionally) marked.

The plural prefix is ay+, the dual is me+, the trial is pxe+ and the general plural is ay+. All trigger lenition (indicated by the "+" signs rather than the hyphens that usually mark prefix boundaries). In nouns which undergo lenition, the plural prefix may be dropped, so the plural of tokx "body" is either aysokx or just sokx. Such plurals are known as short plurals.

tute → aysute → sute
person {} people {} people

The prefix fra- means "every".

The prefix fì- indicates proximal deixis. When used as a plural, it becomes fay+.

payoang → fìpayoang
fish {} {this fish}

The prefix tsa- indicates distal dexis. When used as a plural, it becomes tsay+. There is also the prefix fne- which means a type, sort or class of the noun it is attached to. The suffix -o marks the noun as indefinite (i.e. "some").

'eylan → 'eylano
friend {} {some friend}

The suffix -tsyìp is used as a diminutive/endearment suffix.

utral → utraltsyìp
tree {} bush

The suffix -fkeyk makes the noun refer to the state of the noun to which it is attached.

Masculine and feminine nouns may be distinguished by suffix: the feminine suffix -e and the masculine suffix -an. These are not mandatory. There are no articles (words for "a" or "the").

karyu → karyuan → karyue
teacher {} {male teacher} {} {female teacher}

Nouns are declined for case in a tripartite system, which is rare among human languages. In a tripartite system, there are distinct forms for the object of a clause, as in "he kicks the ball"; the agent of a transitive clause which has such an object, as in "he kicks the ball"; and the subject of an intransitive clause, which does not have an object, as in "he runs". An object is marked with the accusative suffix -ti, and an agent with the ergative suffix -l, while an intransitive subject has no case suffix. The use of such case forms leaves the word order of Naʼvi largely free.

oel ngati tse'a
I.ERG you.ACC {to see}
I see you

The dative case is -r or -ru on nouns ending with a vowel, and -ìr on nouns ending with a consonant. The genitive case is -yä, except on nouns ending with o or u, where it is -ä, or nouns ending with -ia that becomes -iä. The topical case is -ri on nouns ending with a vowel, and -ìri on nouns ending with a consonant. -ri is used to introduce the topic of the clause, and is somewhat equivalent to Japanese wa and the much less common English "as for". It preempts the case of the noun: that is, when a noun is made topical, usually at the beginning of the clause, it takes the -ri suffix rather than the case suffix one would expect from its grammatical role. For example, in,

Oe-ri ontu teya l⟨äng⟩u
I-TOP nose full be⟨PEJ⟩
"My nose is full (of his distasteful smell)", lit. "As for me, (my) nose is full"

since the topic is "I", the subject "nose" is associated with "me": That is, it's understood to be "my nose". "Nose" itself is unmarked for case, as it's the subject of the intransitive verb "to be". However, in most cases the genitive marker -yä is used for this purpose.

Besides case, the role of a noun in a clause may be indicated with adpositions. Any adposition may occur as either as a preposition before the noun, or as an enclitic after the noun, a greater degree of freedom than English allows. For example, "with you" may be either hu nga or ngahu. When used as enclitics, they are much like the numerous cases found in Hungarian and Finnish. When used as prepositions, more along the lines of what English does, certain of them trigger lenition. One of the leniting prepositions is mì "in", as in mì sokx "in the body". This may cause some ambiguity with short plurals: mì sokx could also be short for mì aysokx "in the bodies".

Naʼvi pronouns encode clusivity. That is, there are different words for "we" depending on whether the speaker is including his/her addressee or not. There are also special forms for "the two of us" (with or without the addressee), "the three of us", etc. They do not inflect for gender; although it is possible to distinguish "he" from "she", the distinction is optional. Naʼvi pronouns have the same declension as any other noun. The pronouns are declined for four persons: 1st person inclusive, 1st person exclusive, 2nd person, and 3rd person animate. Most of the plural forms of the various pronouns are made from the addition of the number prefixes to the singular.

		Singular	Dual	Trial	Plural
1st person	exclusive	oe	moe	pxoe	ayoe
1st person	inclusive	oe	oeng	pxoeng	ayoeng
2nd person		nga	menga	pxenga	aynga
3rd animate		po	mefo	pxefo	ayfo/fo

The singular inanimate 3rd person is tsa'u, the demonstrative pronoun. The reflexive pronoun is sno, and the indefinite personal pronoun is fko.

The deferential forms of "I" and "you" are ohe and ngenga. Possessive forms include ngeyä "your" and peyä "her/his". "He" and "she" can optionally be differentiated as poan and poé.

The suffix -yu turns a verb into an agent noun.

slele → sleleyu
{to swim} {} swimmer

The prefix tì, in combination with the infix -us-, forms the gerund.

The suffix -tswo creates a noun indicating the ability to do the verb.

The grammatical distinctions made by nouns are also made by pronouns.

==== Adjectives ====
Naʼvi adjectives are uninflected—that is, they do not agree with the noun they modify—and may occur either before or after the noun. They are marked by a syllable a, which is attached on the side closest to the noun. For example, "a long river" can be expressed either as,

ngim-a kilvan
long-ATTR river
"a long river"

or as,

kilvan a-ngim
river ATTR-long
"a long river"

The free word order holds for all attributives: Genitives (possessives) and relative clauses can also either precede or follow the noun they modify. The latter especially allows for great freedom of expression.

The attributive affix a- is only used when an adjective modifies a noun. Predicative adjectives instead take the "be" verb lu:

kilvan ngim lu
river long be
"The river is long"

Naʼvi has an active participle infix -us-, and the passive participle infix -awn-

There are two prefixes that mark ability tsuk- indicates that the subject (ergative) is able to perform the verb. It is negated with ke-. These turn a verb into an adjective

Nouns can be turned into adjective modifiers with the prefix le-. If this kind of adjective is used after the noun in question, the a- affix is usually dropped. When it is used is after the prefix ke- they become kel-. If the ke- goes before le-, they become kel-.

The Naʼvi copula is the verb lu. They can be linked to nouns or adjectives. Number is only required to be declared once in a phrase involving lu Adjectives linked with lu are not required to have the -a- affix. The verb lu can also be used in the sense of having. In this case, the possessor takes the dative suffix.

lu poru tstxo
{to be} 3SG.DAT name
s/he has a name

==== Verbs ====
Verbs are conjugated for tense and aspect, but not for person. That is, they record distinctions like "I am, I was, I would", but not like "I am, we are, s/he is". Conjugation relies exclusively on infixes, which are like suffixes but go inside the verb. "To hunt", for example, is taron, but "hunted" is t⟨ol⟩aron, with the infix ⟨ol⟩.

Naʼvi verbs primarily use affixes to modify their meaning. Each affix has a specific location. When an infix is added to a Naʼvi syllable, the infix goes after the initial consonant but before the vowel. There are three positions where an infix is added: the pre-first preposition, which goes immediately before the first position, the first position, which goes in the penultimate syllable, and the second position, which goes in the final syllable. If the verb is monosyllabic, all three positions go after each other. If the verb is a compound, the infixes only go in the head Because many Na’vi verbs have two syllables, these commonly occur on the first and last syllable. In monosyllabic words like lu "be", they both appear after the initial onset, keeping their relative order.

The first infix position is taken by infixes for tense, aspect, mood, or combinations thereof; also appearing in this position are participle, reflexive, and causative forms, the latter two of which may co-occur with a tense/aspect/mood infix by preceding it. Tenses are past, recent past, present (unmarked), future, and immediate future; aspects are perfective (completed or contained) and imperfective (ongoing or uncontained). The aspectual forms are not found in English but are somewhat like the distinction between 'having done' and 'was doing'.

taron [hunt] "hunts"
t⟨ìm⟩aron [hunt⟨rec⟩] "just hunted"
t⟨ay⟩aron [hunt⟨fut⟩] "will hunt"
t⟨er⟩aron [hunt⟨impv⟩] "hunting"
t⟨ol⟩aron [hunt⟨pfv⟩] "hunted"
t⟨ì⟨r⟩m⟩aron [hunt⟨rec⟨impv⟩⟩] "was just hunting"

Tense and aspect need not be marked when they can be understood by context or elsewhere in the sentence.

The second infix position is taken by infixes for affect (speaker attitude, whether positive or negative) and for evidentiality (uncertainty or indirect knowledge). For example, in the greeting in the section on nouns, Oel ngati kameie "I See you", the verb kame "to See" is inflected positively as kam⟨ei⟩e to indicate the pleasure the speaker has in meeting you. In the subsequent sentence, Oeri ontu teya längu "My nose is full (of his smell)", however, the phrase teya lu "is full" is inflected pejoratively as teya l⟨äng⟩u to indicate the speaker's distaste at the experience. Examples with both infix positions filled:

t⟨ìrm⟩ar⟨ei⟩on [hunt⟨rec.impv⟩⟨laud⟩] "was just hunting": The speaker is happy about it, whether due to success or just the pleasure of the hunt
t⟨ay⟩ar⟨äng⟩on [hunt⟨fut⟩⟨pej⟩] "will hunt": The speaker is anxious about or bored by it

The causative infix is -eyk-. When a causative verb is used, the ergative becomes the dative, and the accusative remains as it is. The reflexive infix is -äp-. When it is used with -eyk-, it always comes first (-äpeyk-).

There are four types of tense infixes, which mark for the past, near past, general, near future and future tenses, and that mark for the general, imperfective, and perfective aspects The first type are the regular ones

	Past	Near past	General	Near future	Future
General	-am-	-ìm-	-∅-	-ìy-	-ay-
Perfective	-alm-	-ìlm-	-ol-	-ìly-	-aly-
Imperfective	-arm-	-ìrm-	-er-	-ìry-	-ary-

There are two future intent infixes.

Near Future	Future
-ìsy-	-asy-

There are also a few subjunctive infixes

Past	General	Future	Perfective	Imperfective
-imv-	-iv-	-iyev- (or -ìyev)	-ilv-	-irv-

Naʼvi has a few modal verbs, which when used, they must take the tense affixes and the modified verb must take the general subjunctive. The subject of the modal verb takes the intransitive case.

emyu new syuvet ayfol yivom
chef.INTR want food.ACC them.ERG eat.SBJV
The chef wants them to eat the food

There are four infixes in 2nd position: two indicating affect, two indicating speaker judgement. The infix -ei- indicates that the speaker is happy about the verb. The infix -äng- indicates that the speaker is unhappy about the verb. The variant -eiy- of -ei- is used behind i,ì, ll, and rr and the variant -eng- of -äng- is used behind i

The infix -ats- is used to indicate that the speaker is uncertain of the accuracy of their statement. There is also the honorific infix -uy-.

==== Questions ====
Yes–no questions are formed with the word srak(e), which can go at the beginning or end of a clause (it has no e if it occurs at the end of a clause.

The affix -pe+ is used to form question words when attached to a noun, which means which. It can go before or after the noun, and it causes lenition if placed before the noun. If it is a prefix, and the noun is plural, they will combine and become pem+ (dual), pep+ (trial) or pay+ (plural).

==== Adpositions ====
Adpositions may go before or after the noun they modify. If it is before, then it is a separate word, but if after, it is an enclitic attached to the noun. For example, "with you" may either be hu nga or ngahu. When adpositions occur as prepositions, a few of them trigger lenition.

==== Relative clauses ====
Relative clauses are formed with the particle a. If the head noun is the ergative or accusative of the phrase it modifies, it is not present in the relative clause. If the head of the relative clause uses any other case or adposition, a resumptive pronoun is used.

==== Conditionals ====
A conditional is use the words txo and tsakrr. The condition goes after txo, and takes the subjunctive case, then the consequent goes after the tsakrr (which is often omitted) and takes the relevant case. A counter-factual conditional uses the words zun for the condition and zel for the consequent, and uses the subjunctive in both clauses

=== Lexicon ===
The Naʼvi language currently has over 2,600 words. These include a few English loan words such as kunsìp "gunship". Additionally, the community of speakers is working with Dr. Frommer to further develop the language. Naʼvi is a very modular language and the total number of usable words far exceeds the 2,600 dictionary words. For example: rol "to sing" → tìrusol "the act of singing" or ngop "to create" → ngopyu "creator". Workarounds using existing words also abound in the Naʼvi corpus, such as eltu lefngap "metallic brain" for "computer" and palulukantsyìp "little thanator" for "cat".

==== Numbers ====
Naʼvi's native number system is an octal one. The numbers 0-7, 10_{8} (8), and 100_{8} (64) are

0	1	2	3	4	5	6	7	10_{8}	100_{8}
kew	'aw	mune	pxey	tsìng	mrr	pukap	kinä	vol	zam

The powers of eight are combined with special prefixes to create multiples of powers of eight. These are the first syllable of the corresponding number, except for 1, which has none, and 2, which has me- instead of mu-. To create a number that is a power of eight plus a number from 1 to 7, the l of vol is deleted (except for 1), and the initial consonant undergoes lenition.

Ordinals of the aforementioned numbers can be formed with the suffix -ve, but there are a few irregularities

Naʼvi also has the numbers 'eyt eight and nayn nine as loanwords from English.
