= Syntactic pivot =

The syntactic pivot is the verb argument around which sentences "revolve" in a given language. This usually means the following:

- If the verb has more than zero arguments, then one argument is the syntactic pivot.
- If the verb agrees with at least one of its arguments, then it agrees with the syntactic pivot.
- In coordinated propositions, in languages where an argument can be left out, the omitted argument is the syntactic pivot.

The first two characteristics have to do with simple morphosyntax, and from them, it is quite obvious the syntactic pivot in English (and most other European languages) is called the subject. An English verb cannot lack a subject (even in the imperative mood, the subject is implied to be "you" and is not ambiguous or unspecified) and cannot have just a direct object and no subject; and (at least in the present tense, and for the verb to be) it agrees partially with the subject.

The third point deserves an explanation. Consider the following sentence:

I shot the deer and killed it.

There are two coordinated propositions, and the second proposition lacks an explicit subject, but since the subject is the syntactic pivot, the second proposition is assumed to have the same subject as the first one. One cannot do so with a direct object (in English). The result would be ungrammatical or have a different meaning:

*I shot the deer and I killed.

== Nominative-accusative languages ==
The syntactic pivot is a feature of the morphosyntactic alignment of the language. In nominative–accusative languages, the syntactic pivot is the so-called "subject" (the argument marked with the nominative case). In ergative–absolutive languages, the syntactic pivot may be the argument marked with the absolutive case but not always so since ergative languages are often not "pure" and show a mixed behaviour (they can have ergative morphology and accusative syntax).

== Passive voice languages ==
Languages with a passive voice construction may resort to it to allow the default syntactic pivot to shift its semantic role (from agent to patient) in a coordinated proposition:

He worked hard and was awarded a prize.

== Bibliography ==
- Anderson, Stephen. (1976). On the notion of subject in ergative languages. In C. Li. (Ed.), Subject and topic (pp. 1–24). New York: Academic Press.
- Dixon, R. M. W. (1994). Ergativity. Cambridge University Press.
- Foley, William; & Van Valin, Robert. (1984). Functional syntax and universal grammar. Cambridge University Press.
- Plank, Frans. (Ed.). (1979). Ergativity: Towards a theory of grammatical relations. London: Academic Press.
