= Antipassive voice =

Type of grammatical voice

The antipassive voice (abbreviated ANTIP or AP) is a type of grammatical voice that either does not include the object or includes the object in an oblique case. This construction is similar to the passive voice, in that it decreases the verb's valency by one – the passive by deleting the agent and "promoting" the object to become the subject of the passive construction, the antipassive by deleting the object and "promoting" the agent to become the subject of the antipassive construction.

== Occurrence ==
The antipassive voice is found in Basque, in Mayan, Salishan, Northeast Caucasian, Austronesian, and Australian languages, and also in some Amazonian languages (e.g. Cavineña, Kanamarí).

Antipassive voice predominantly occurs in ergative languages where the deletion of an object "promotes" the subject from ergative case to absolutive case. In certain accusative languages that have verbal agreement with both subject and object, the antipassive is usually formed by deletion of the object affix. Examples of accusative languages with this type of antipassive are Maasai, Comanche and Cahuilla. A number of direct–inverse languages also have the antipassive voice. Somewhat less conventionally, markers that reduce a verb's transitivity by syntactically eliminating objects or demoting them to oblique arguments in accusative languages such as Swedish, Russian or some Turkic languages have recently been described by many linguists as antipassive as well.

The antipassive voice is very rare in active–stative languages generally and in nominative–accusative languages that have only one-place or no verbal agreement. There are a few exceptions to this trend, such as Krongo and the Songhay language Koyraboro Senni, both of which rely on dedicated antipassive markers that are rare in the more typical type of language with an antipassive.

== Examples ==
=== Kʼicheʼ ===
In the Mayan language Kʼicheʼ, the core arguments of a clause are unmarked for case, and are cross-referenced by person markers on the verb. Person marking follows an ergative–absolutive pattern. Non-core participants are expressed by prepositional phrases.

In the following transitive clause, the object "your mother" is the absolutive argument. It is unmarked for case and is not overtly cross-referenced, since the absolutive third person singular prefix is zero. The agent "you" is represented by the ergative second person singular prefix a-.

k-∅-a-yoq' ti a-na:n
ASP-3SG.ABS-2SG.ERG-mock DEF your-mother
'You mock your mother.'

In the corresponding antipassive clause, which is formally intransitive, the verb takes the antipassive suffix -on. The original object "your mother" is now expressed by a prepositional phrase, while the agent "you" has become the subject argument and is thus expressed by the absolutive second person singular prefix at-.

k-at-yoq'-on če:h ti a-na:n
ASP-2SG.ABS-mock-AP to DEF your-mother
'You mock your mother.'

=== Basque ===
Basque has an antipassive voice which puts the agent into the absolutive case but does not delete the absolutive object. This leads to the agent and object being in the same case.

Gauza miragarriak ikusi ditut (nik)
thing wonderful-PL-ABS see-PERF have-PRES-PL-1P (I-ERG)
'I have seen wonderful things.'

when transformed using the antipassive voice, becomes:

Gauza miragarriak ikusirik nago / ikusia naiz
thing wonderful-PL-ABS see-PERF-STAT am / see-PERF-ACT am
'I am seeing / have seen wonderful things.'

== Function ==
Antipassives often have functions that are analogous to those of passives in nominative-accusative languages, albeit 'in reverse':

- They may show that the agent is more relevant than the patient, i.e. that the patient is less relevant, e.g. because it is indefinite or generic, or the construction can be a way of omitting the patient altogether (which may otherwise even be ungrammatical in certain ergative languages). For example, antipassives may be used in sentences that translate to 'The dog bites (people in general)' or 'The dog bit a man'. This can be compared with the use of the passive in nominative-accusative languages such as English to deemphasise or omit the agent: 'The man was bitten (by a dog)' or 'The man is often bitten'.
- They may show that the focus is on something else than the actual result of the action. For example, the focus may be on the agent's general propensity to perform the action, as in 'John makes great cakes'. Alternatively, the patient may be only incompletely affected, as in 'John is pulling at the chair', as opposed to 'John is pulling the chair'.
- They may be a way of avoiding atypical mapping between the relative or absolute animacy level of an argument and its syntactic function. Specifically, they may prevent the casting of a highly animate argument as an object in the absolutive case and/or of a low-animacy argument as a subject in the ergative case. For example, a sentence translating to 'The falling lamp hit John' may be paraphrased as something akin to 'The falling lamp hit at John'. This can be compared with the English use of the passive in 'John was hit by the falling lamp'.

A further purpose of antipassive construction is often to make certain arguments available as pivots for relativization, coordination of sentences, or similar constructions. For example, in Dyirbal the omitted argument in conjoined sentences must be in absolutive case. Thus, the following sentence is ungrammatical:

*baji jaɽa bani-ɲu balan ɟuɡumbil buɽa-n
M-ABS man-ABS come-NFUT F-ABS woman-ABS see-NFUT
'The man came and saw the woman.'

In the conjoined sentence, the omitted argument (the man) would have to be in ergative case, being the agent of a transitive verb (to see). This is not allowed in Dyirbal. In order to make this sentence grammatical, the antipassive, which promotes the original ergative to absolutive and puts the former absolutive (the woman) into dative case has to be used:

baji jaɽa bani-ɲu baɡun ɟuɡumbil-ɡu buɽal-ŋa-ɲu
M-ABS man-ABS come-NFUT F-DAT woman-DAT see-ANTIP-NFUT
'The man came and saw the woman.'

In addition, antipassives frequently convey aspectual, modal and temporal information. They are preferred in imperfective, inceptive, potential, purposive and non-past-tense clauses and may hence signal that the clause belongs to these types. This is connected to the antipassives' general focus on the agent, which makes them frequent in clauses where the agent is in control of the action or the action depends on the proneness of the agent to perform it.

== Defining "antipassive" ==
The term antipassive is applied to a wide range of grammatical structures and is therefore difficult to define. R. M. W. Dixon has nonetheless proposed four criteria for determining whether a construction is an antipassive:

1. It applies to clauses containing traditionally transitive predicates and forms a derived intransitive.
2. The agent takes the subject role.
3. The object takes a peripheral role in the clause, getting marked by a non-core case/preposition/etc. This can be omitted, but there's always the option of including it.
4. There is some explicit marking of the construction.

While the first, second and fourth criterion are widely accepted, Dixon's formulation of the third criterion is controversial, in that many linguists consider as antipassives also constructions that give no option of including the object.

== Historical origin ==
The antipassive construction is often signalled by the same markers as the reflexive and reciprocal constructions, the unifying feature being a reduction in transitivity. Indeed, it is more common for languages to have a coincidence of the antipassive marker with other markers than to have a specialised antipassive marker. In this connection, it has also been argued that even nominative-accusative languages such as Swedish and Russian can be said to have antipassives (Swedish hunden bit-s 'the dog bites (in general, unspecified patient)', Russian sobaka kusaet-sja (with the same meaning)); both have markers originating from a reflexive pronoun, and a similar origin of antipassives is attested in Pama-Nyungan, Kartvelian, Chukotko-Kamchatkan and Turkic languages.

Other attested origins are from benefactive/malefactive constructions and indefinite/generic object markers. For some languages, origin from the secondary verbalization of action nouns or participles has been posited: in Rgyalrong languages, where the antipassive prefixes appear to derive from denominal derivations, the development being "transitive verb > derived action noun > new derived intransitive verb", and a similar process is claimed to have taken place in Western Mande languages, where the intransitive verb was formed by adding the verb 'to do' ('to buy' > 'a purchase' > 'to do a purchase'). Origin from combinations of deverbal nominalizations or participles and verbalizing postbases has also been claimed for West Greenlandic (passive participle + 'make, become', deverbal nominalization + 'get' and deverbal nominalization + 'provide with' for the markers -(s)i-, -nnig- and -ller- respectively). For Godoberi, it has been argued that rather than the antipassive having the secondary function of signalling atelic aspect, it has itself arisen as a side-effect of an atelic aspect marker.
