= Preparatory subject =

Concept in grammar

In grammar, a preparatory subject or anticipatory subject is a subject which represents a verb clause later in the sentence. It as a preparatory subject is "commonly used in speech and writing, especially when the subject is longer than the complement and is better placed at the end of the sentence".

== Examples ==
It is fun to play the piano

is equivalent to

Playing the piano is fun

"It" in the first sentence is a preparatory subject, referring to the clause "to play the piano".
