= Intransitive case =

Grammatical case

In grammar, the intransitive case (abbreviated INTR), also denominated passive case or patient case, is a grammatical case used in some languages to mark the argument of an intransitive verb, but not used with transitive verbs. It is generally seen in languages that display tripartite nominal morphologies; it contrasts with the nominative and absolutive cases employed in other languages' morphosyntax to mark the argument of intransitive clauses.

As a distinct intransitive case has zero marking in all languages known to have one, and is the citation form of the noun, it is frequently called absolutive, a word used for an unmarked citation-form argument in various case systems.

== See also ==
- Transitive case
- Nominative case
- Absolutive case
