= Ergative case =

Grammatical case

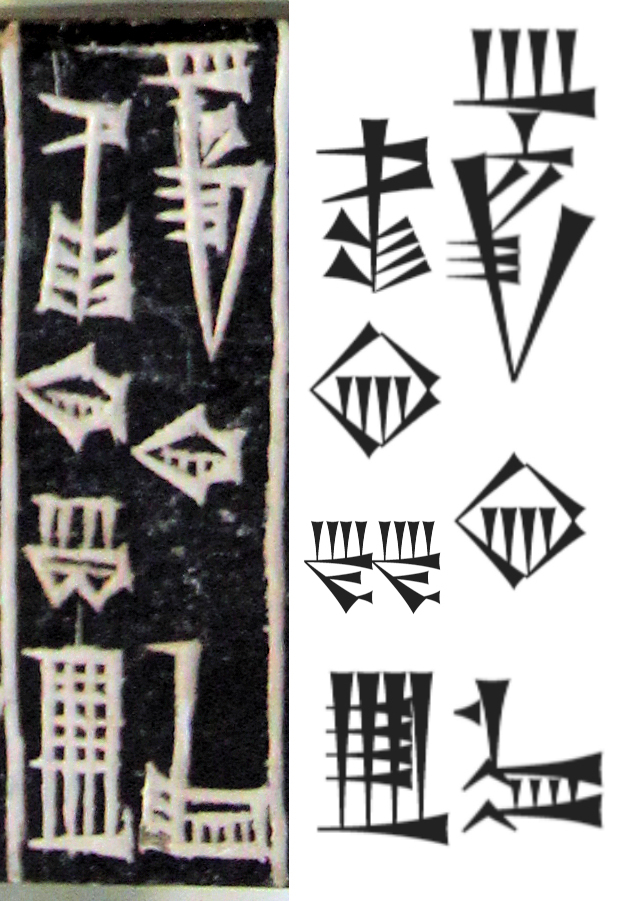
Cuneiform inscription Lugal Kiengi Kiuri 𒈗𒆠𒂗𒄀𒆠𒌵, "King of Sumer and Akkad", on a seal of Sumerian king Shulgi (r. c. 2094–2047 BCE). The final ke_{4} 𒆤 is the composite of -k (genitive case) and -e (ergative case).

In grammar, the ergative case (abbreviated erg) is the grammatical case that identifies a nominal phrase as the agent of a transitive verb in ergative–absolutive languages.

Ergative–absolutive alignment contrasts with nominative–accusative alignment in which subjects of transitive and intransitive sentences behave similarly, and differently from objects of transitive sentences. For example, a sentence like "I help him" has "him" as the object and "he sleeps" has "he" as the subject. But in languages that have ergative-absolutive alignment, the ergative case is used as the subject only in a transitive sentence, otherwise the absolutive case is used. An analogue in English would be saying "I help him" and "him sleeps."

== Characteristics ==
In such languages, the ergative case is typically marked (most salient), while the absolutive case is unmarked. Recent work in case theory has vigorously supported the idea that the ergative case identifies the agent (the intentful performer of an action) of a verb.

In Kalaallisut (Greenlandic) for example, the ergative case is used to mark subjects of transitive verbs and possessors of nouns. This syncretism with the genitive is commonly referred to as the relative case.

Nez Perce has a three-way nominal case system with both ergative (-nim) and accusative (-ne) plus an absolute (unmarked) case for intransitive subjects: hipáayna qíiwn ‘the old man arrived’; hipáayna wewúkiye ‘the elk arrived’; wewúkiyene péexne qíiwnim ‘the old man saw an elk’.

Sahaptin has an ergative noun case (with suffix -nɨm) that is limited to transitive constructions only when the direct object is 1st or 2nd person: iwapáatayaaš łmámanɨm ‘the old woman helped me’; paanáy iwapáataya łmáma ‘the old woman helped him/her’ (direct); páwapaataya łmámayin ‘the old woman helped him/her’ (inverse).

In languages with an optional ergative, the choice between marking the ergative case or not depends on semantic or pragmatics aspects such as marking focus on the argument.

Other languages that use the ergative case are Georgian, Chechen, and other Caucasian languages, Mayan languages, Mixe–Zoque languages, Wagiman and other Australian Aboriginal languages as well as Basque, Burushaski and Tibetan. Among all Indo-European languages, only Yaghnobi, Kurdish language varieties (including Kurmanji, Zazaki and Sorani) and Pashto from the Iranian languages and Hindi/Urdu, along with some other Indo-Aryan languages, are ergative.

The ergative case is also a feature of some constructed languages such as Na'vi, Ithkuil and Black Speech.

== See also ==
- Antipassive voice
- Ergative-absolutive language
- Morphosyntactic alignment
- Volition (linguistics)
