= Absolutive case =

Grammatical case

In grammar, the absolutive case (abbreviated ABS) is the case of nouns in ergative–absolutive languages that would generally be the subjects of intransitive verbs or the objects of transitive verbs in the translational equivalents of nominative–accusative languages such as English.

== In ergative–absolutive languages ==
In languages with ergative–absolutive alignment, the absolutive is the case used to mark both the subject of an intransitive verb and the object of a transitive verb in addition to being used for the citation form of a noun. It contrasts with the marked ergative case, which marks the subject of a transitive verb.

For example, in Basque the noun mutil 'boy' takes the bare singular article -a both as the subject of the intransitive clause mutila etorri da ('the boy came') and as the object of the transitive clause Irakasleak mutila ikusi du ('the teacher has seen the boy') in which the agent bears the ergative ending -a-k.

In a very few cases, a marked absolutive has been reported, including in Nias and Sochiapam Chinantec.

== Other uses ==
Occasionally, the term 'absolutive case' (or also: 'absolute case') is used for the unmarked case form in languages with other alignment types. This is especially common in the tradition of descriptive linguistics of African languages. In marked nominative languages, where the nominative has case inflection, the accusative is unmarked and also serves as citation form. In these languages, the unmarked accusative/citation form is thus often called 'absolutive'. On the other hand, in certain nominative–accusative languages, it is the accusative which is explicitly marked for case, whereas the nominative is unmarked and serves as citation form. In such situations, the term 'absolutive' is occasionally used to describe the unmarked nominative/citation form.

=== In tripartite languages ===
In tripartite languages, both the agent and object of a transitive clause have case forms, ergative and accusative, and the agent of an intransitive clause is the unmarked citation form. It is occasionally called the intransitive case, but absolutive is also used and is perhaps more accurate since it is not limited to core agents of intransitive verbs.

== See also ==
- Morphosyntactic alignment
