= Intransitive verb =

Verb that does not entail a direct object

In grammar, an intransitive verb is a verb, aside from an auxiliary verb, whose context does not entail a transitive object. That lack of an object distinguishes intransitive verbs from transitive verbs, which entail one or more objects. Additionally, intransitive verbs are typically considered within a class apart from modal verbs and defective verbs.

== Examples ==
In the following sentences, verbs are used without a direct object:

- "Rivers flow."
- "I sneezed."
- "My dog ran."
- "Water evaporates when it's hot."
- "You've grown since I last saw you!"
- "I wonder how long it will be until I see you again after I move."

The following sentences contain transitive verbs (they entail one or more objects):

- "We watched a movie last night."
- "She's making promises."
- "When I said that, my sister smacked me."
- "Santa gave me a present."
- "He continuously clicked his pen and it was incredibly annoying to me."

Some verbs, called ambitransitive verbs, may entail objects but do not always require one. Such a verb may be used as intransitive in one sentence, and as transitive in another.

Intransitive	Transitive
"It is raining."	"It is raining cats and dogs."
"When he finished the race, he vomited."	"When he finished the race, he vomited up his lunch."
"Water evaporates when it's hot."	"Heat evaporates water."
"He's been singing all day."	"He's been singing barbershop all day."
"You've grown since I last saw you."	"You've grown a beard since I last saw you!"

In general, intransitive verbs often involve weather terms, involuntary processes, states, bodily functions, motion, action processes, cognition, sensation, and emotion.

== Valency-changing operations ==
The valency of a verb is related to transitivity. Where the transitivity of a verb only considers the objects, the valency of a verb considers all the arguments that correspond to a verb, including both the subject of the verb and all of the objects.

It is possible to change the contextually indicated sense of a verb from transitive to intransitive, and in so doing to change the valency.

In languages that have a passive voice, a transitive verb in the active voice becomes intransitive in the passive voice. For example, consider the following sentence:

David hugged Mary.

In this sentence, "hugged" is a transitive verb with "Mary" as its object. The sentence can be made passive with its former direct object "Mary" as the new grammatical subject as follows:

Mary was hugged.

This shift is called promotion of the object.

The passive-voice construction does not indicate an object. The passivized sentence could be continued with the agent:

Mary was hugged by David.

It cannot be continued with a direct object to be taken by "was hugged". For example, it would be ungrammatical to write "Mary was hugged her daughter" to show that Mary and her daughter shared a hug.

Intransitive verbs can be rephrased as passive constructs in some languages. In English, intransitive verbs can be used in the passive voice when a prepositional phrase is included, as in, "The houses were lived in by millions of people."

Some languages, such as Dutch, have an impersonal passive voice that lets an intransitive verb without a prepositional phrase be passive. In German, a sentence such as "The children sleep" can be made passive to remove the subject and becomes, "It is slept." However, no addition like "... by the children" is possible in such cases.

In languages with ergative–absolutive alignment, the passive voice (where the object of a transitive verb becomes the subject of an intransitive verb) does not make sense, because the noun associated with the intransitive verb is marked as the object, not as the subject. Instead, these often have an antipassive voice. In this context, the subject of a transitive verb is promoted to the "object" of the corresponding intransitive verb. In the context of a nominative–accusative language like English, this promotion is nonsensical because intransitive verbs do not entail objects, they entail subjects. So, the subject of a transitive verb ("I" in I hug him) is also the subject of the intransitive passive construction (I was hugged by him). But in an ergative–absolutive language like Dyirbal, "I" in the transitive I hug him would involve the ergative case, but the "I" in I was hugged would involve the absolutive, and so by analogy the antipassive construction more closely resembles *was hugged me. Thus in this example, the ergative is promoted to the absolutive, and the agent (i.e., him), which was formerly marked by the absolutive, is deleted to form the antipassive voice (or is marked in a different way, in the same way that in the English passive voice can still be specified as the agent of the action using by him in I was hugged by him—for example, Dyirbal puts the agent in the dative case, and Basque retains the agent in the absolutive).

== Ambitransitivity ==
In many languages, there are "ambitransitive" verbs, which can occur either in a transitive or intransitive sense. For example, English play is ambitransitive, since it is grammatical to say His son plays, and it is also grammatical to say His son plays guitar. English is rather flexible as regards verb valency, and so it has a high number of ambitransitive verbs; other languages are more rigid and require explicit valency changing operations (voice, causative morphology, etc.) to transform a verb from intransitive to transitive or vice versa.

In some ambitransitive verbs are ergative verbs for which the alignment of the syntactic arguments to the semantic roles is exchanged. An example of this is the verb break in English.

(1) He broke the cup.
(2) The cup broke.

In (1), the verb is transitive, and the subject is the agent of the action, i.e. the performer of the action of breaking the cup. In (2), the verb is intransitive and the subject is the patient of the action, i.e. it is the thing affected by the action, not the one that performs it. In fact, the patient is the same in both sentences, and sentence (2) is an example of implicit middle voice. This has also been termed an anticausative or inchoative, indicating a change of state without an external cause.

Other alternating intransitive verbs in English are change and sink.

In the Romance languages, these verbs are often called pseudo-reflexive, because they are signaled in the same way as reflexive verbs, using the clitic particle se. Compare the following (in Spanish):

(3a) La taza se rompió. ("The cup broke.")
(3b) El barco se hundió. ("The boat sank.")
(4a) Ella se miró en el espejo. ("She looked at herself in the mirror.")
(4b) El gato se lava. ("The cat washes itself.")

Sentences (3a) and (3b) show Romance pseudo-reflexive phrases, corresponding to English alternating intransitives. As in The cup broke, they are inherently without an agent; their deep structure does not and can not contain one. The action is not reflexive (as in (4a) and (4b)) because it is not performed by the subject; it just happens to it. Therefore, this is not the same as passive voice, where an intransitive verb phrase appears, but there is an implicit agent (which can be made explicit using a complement phrase):

(5) La copa estaba rota (por el niño). ("The cup was broken (by the child).")
(6) El barco fue hundido (por piratas). ("The boat was sunk (by pirates).")

Other ambitransitive verbs (like eat) are not of the alternating type; the subject is always the agent of the action, and the object is simply optional. A few verbs are of both types at once, like read: compare I read, I read a magazine, and this magazine reads easily.

Some languages like Japanese have different forms of certain verbs to show transitivity. For example, there are two forms of the verb "to start":

(7) 会議が始まる。 (Kaigi ga hajimaru., "The meeting starts.")

(8) 会長が会議を始める。 (Kaichō ga kaigi o hajimeru., "The president starts the meeting.")

In Japanese, the form of the verb indicates the number of arguments the sentence needs to have.

== Unaccusative and unergative verbs ==
Especially in some languages, it makes sense to classify intransitive verbs as:

- unaccusative when the subject is not an agent; that is, it does not actively initiate the action of the verb (e.g. "die", "fall").
  - Unaccusative verbs are typically used to show action or movement.
    - Examples:
      - I arrived at the party around 8 o'clock.
      - Do you know what time the plane departed?
      - The disease spread to other towns.
      - I sat on the train.
      - I was in a car accident and the other person appeared out of no where.
- unergative when they have an agent subject.
  - Examples:
    - I am going to resign from my position at the bank.
    - I have to run six miles in the morning.
    - John ate.

This distinction may in some cases be reflected in the grammar, where for instance different auxiliary verbs may be used for the two categories.

== Cognate objects ==
In many languages, including English, some or all intransitive verbs can entail cognate objects—objects formed from the same roots as the verbs themselves; for example, the verb sleep is ordinarily intransitive, but one can say, "He slept a troubled sleep", meaning roughly "He slept, and his sleep was troubled."

== Other languages ==
In Pingelapese, a Micronesian language, intransitive verb sentence structure is often used, with no object attached. There must be a stative or active verb to have an intransitive sentence. A stative verb has a person or an object that is directly influenced by a verb. An active verb has the direct action performed by the subject. The word order that is most commonly associated with intransitive sentences is subject-verb. However, verb-subject is used if the verb is unaccusative or by discourse pragmatics.

In Tokelauan, the noun phrases used with verbs are required when verbs are placed in groups. Verbs are divided into two major groups. Every verbal sentence must have that structure, which contains a singular noun phrase, without a preposition, called an unmarked noun phrase. Only if a ko-phrase precedes the predicate, that rule may be ignored. The agent is what speakers of the language call the person who is performing the action of the verb. If a noun phrase that starts with the preposition e is able to express the agent, and the receiving person or thing that the agent is performing the action of the verb to is expressed by a singular noun phrase that lack a preposition, or unmarked noun phrase, the verb is then considered transitive. All other verbs are considered intransitive.

== See also ==
- Transitivity (grammatical category)
- Transitive verbs
- Verbs
- Ditransitive verbs
- Valency (linguistics)
- Morphosyntactic alignment
- English passive voice
