= Nominative–accusative alignment =

Concept of sentence structure in linguistics

Nominative–accusative alignment

In linguistic typology, nominative–accusative alignment is a type of morphosyntactic alignment in which subjects of intransitive verbs are treated like subjects of transitive verbs, and are distinguished from objects of transitive verbs in basic clause constructions. Nominative–accusative alignment can be coded by case-marking, verb agreement and/or word order. It has a wide global distribution and is the most common alignment system among the world's languages (including English). Languages with nominative–accusative alignment are commonly called nominative–accusative languages.

== Comparison with other alignment types ==
A transitive verb is associated with two noun phrases (or arguments): a subject and a direct object. An intransitive verb is associated with only one argument, a subject. The different kinds of arguments are usually represented as S, A, and O. S is the sole argument of an intransitive verb, A is the subject (or most agent-like) argument of a transitive verb, and O is the direct object (or most patient-like) argument of a transitive verb. English has nominative–accusative alignment in its case marking of personal pronouns: the single argument (S) of an intransitive verb ("I" in the sentence "I walked.") behaves grammatically like the agent (A) of a transitive verb ("I" in the sentence "I saw them.") but differently from the object (O) of a transitive verb ("me" in the sentence “they saw me.").

	Nominative–accusative	Ergative–absolutive	Tripartite
A	same	different	different
S	same	same	different
O	different	same	different

This is in contrast with ergative–absolutive alignment, where S is coded in the same way as O, while A receives distinct marking, or tripartite alignment, where A, S and O all are coded in a different manner.

=== Split ergativity ===
It is common for languages (such as Georgian and Hindustani) to have overlapping alignment systems, which exhibit both nominative–accusative and ergative–absolutive coding, a phenomenon called split ergativity. In fact, there are relatively few languages that exhibit only ergative–absolutive alignment (called pure ergativity) and tend to be isolated in certain regions of the world, such as the Caucasus, parts of North America and Mesoamerica, the Tibetan Plateau, and Australia. Such languages include Sumerian, Standard Tibetan, and Mayan.

== Coding properties of nominative–accusative alignment ==
Nominative–accusative alignment can manifest itself in visible ways, called coding properties. Often, these visible properties are morphological and the distinction will appear as a difference in the actual morphological form and spelling of the word, or as case particles (pieces of morphology) which will appear before or after the word.

=== Case marking ===
If a language exhibits morphological case marking, arguments S and A will appear in the nominative case and argument O will appear in the accusative case, or in a similar case such as the oblique. There may be more than one case fulfilling the accusative role; for instance, Finnish marks objects with the partitive or the accusative to contrast telicity. It is highly common for only accusative arguments to exhibit overt case marking while nominative arguments exhibit null (or absent) case markings. In Modern English, case marking is only found with first and (non-neuter) third person pronouns, which have distinct subject and object forms.

English

I walked.
1SG:SBJ walk:PAST

I saw them.
1SG:SBJ see:PAST 3PL:OBJ

Japanese

花瓶が 壊れた
Kabin-ga(S) kowareta
vase-NOM broke
‘A vase broke’

私 は 花瓶を 壊した
Watashi(S) wa kabin-wo(O) kowashita
I TOP vase-ACC broke
‘I broke the vase’

Russian

Девушка-Ø работа-ет
Dyevushka-Ø rabota-yet
(adolescent-/youth-)girl-NOM work
‘A/The (adolescent/youth) girl/young lady/young woman works/is working’

Студент-Ø читает книг-у
Studyent-Ø chitayet knig-u
student-NOM read-3.SG.PRES book-ACC
‘A/The student read/is reading a/the book’

Sanskrit

Áśva-ḥ(S) aghnata
horse-NOM slain
‘A horse was slain’

Vīrá-ḥ(S) áśva-m(O) ahan
man-NOM horse-ACC slew
‘The man slew a horse’

==== Differential object marking (DOM) ====
Not all arguments are equally likely to exhibit overt case marking. In languages with nominative–accusative alignment, it is common to divide direct objects into two classes (with respect to overt case marking), a phenomenon called ‘differential object marking’ by Bossong (1985).

=== Word order ===
Some languages code very little through morphology and are more dependent on syntax to encode meaning and grammatical relationships. If a language relies less on overt case marking, alignment may be coded through word order, as in this example from Indonesian.

Indonesian

saya_{i} me_{i}-mandi-kan pria itu
1SG AT-wash-APPL man that
‘I bathe that man’

In the following example from French, all subjects, both S and A, appear before the verb while O appears after the verb. Arguments occurring before the verb are coded as nominative, while arguments occurring directly after the verb are coded as accusative.

French

Je(S) travaille
I-NOM work
‘I work’

Je(A) jette un ballon(O)
I-NOM throw a ball-ACC
‘I throw a ball’

=== Verb agreement ===
Alternatively, alignment can also manifest visibly through agreement on the verb. In the following example from Amharic, the verb can be head-marked for S, A, and O. Both S in the intransitive clause and A in the transitive clause are marked by the same affix (-ə ‘3SG.M’), while O in the transitive clause is marked by a different affix (-w ‘3SG.M.O’).

Amharic

intransitive

Ləmma hed-ə
Lemma go.PFV-3SG.M
‘Lemma came’

transitive

Ləmma t’ərmus-u-n səbbər-ə-w
Lemma bottle-DEF-ACC break.PFV-3SG.M-3SG.M.O
‘Lemma breaks the bottle’

English has residual verb agreement with nominative–accusative alignment, which is only manifest with third person singular S and A in present tense.

== Behavioral properties of accusativity ==
Nominative–accusative alignment can also be distinguished through behavioral properties, in the way a nominative or accusative argument will behave when placed in particular syntactic constructions. This has to do with the impact of alignment on the level of the whole sentence rather than the individual word. Morphosyntactic alignment determines which arguments can be omitted in a coordinate structure during the process of conjunction reduction (deleting arguments from the ends of joined clauses). In nominative–accusative, only arguments S and A can be omitted and not argument O.

English

a. Sue-NOM_{i} saw Judy-ACC_{j} , and she_{i/j} ran.
b. Sue_{i} saw Judy_{j} and ____{i/*j} ran.
c. Sue_{i} saw Judy_{j}, and she_{i/j} was frightened.
d. Sue_{i} saw Judy_{j} and ____{i/*j} was frightened.

The omitted subject argument of the embedded clause must correspond to the subject (nominative) of the matrix-clause. If it corresponds to the object (accusative), the sentence is ungrammatical.

If English were an ergative–absolutive language, one would expect to see:

b’. Sue_{i} saw Judy_{j}, and ____{*i/j} ran.
c’. Sue_{i} saw Judy_{j}, and ____{*i/j} was frightened.

Here the omitted argument of the embedded clause corresponds to the direct object (absolutive) of the matrix-clause. If it corresponds to the subject (ergative), the sentence is ungrammatical.

The alignment system also impacts the triggering and realization of other such syntactic processes as raising constructions, subject-controlled subject deletion and object-controlled subject deletion.

== Distribution ==
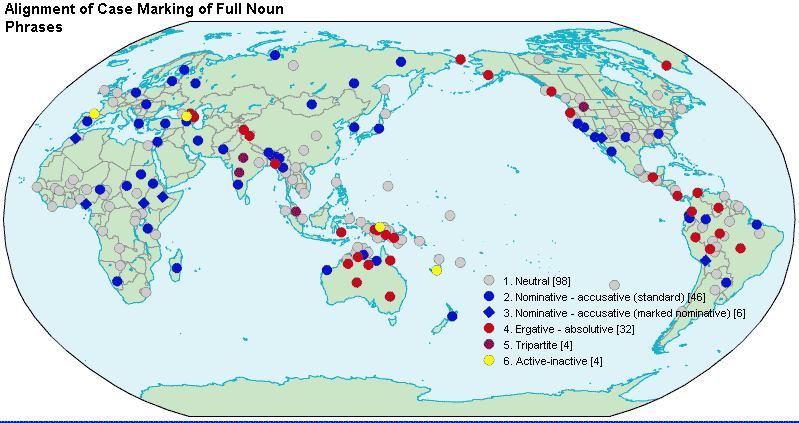
Distribution of languages by alignment type

Languages exhibiting accusative alignment are the most widespread of all of the alignment types. These languages can be found on every continent, in comparison to languages with ergative alignment that are restricted to certain areas of the world, namely the Caucasus, parts of North and South America, the Tibetan plateau, and Australia. The map shows the distribution of languages with the various alignment types, and the following list gives a short sampling of accusative languages and their distribution across the globe:

North America:

- Cahuilla – U.S.
- Koasati – U.S.
- Miwok – U.S.

Australasia:

- Kayardild – Australia
- Mangarayi – Australia
- Māori – New Zealand

South America:

- Aymara – Bolivia, Chile, Peru
- Barasana – Colombia
- Quechua – Ecuador
- Xavante – Brazil

Europe:

- Armenian – Armenia
- Finnish – Finland
- German – Germany
- Greek – Greece
- Hungarian – Hungary
- Turkish – Turkey
- Russian – Russia
- Spanish – Spain

Africa:

- Berber – Morocco
- Igbo – Nigeria
- Iraqw – Tanzania
- Kanuri – Chad
- Khoekhoe – Namibia
- Malagasy – Madagascar
- Nubian – Sudan
- Oromo – Ethiopia

Asia:

- Brahui – Pakistan
- Burmese – Myanmar
- Garo – India
- Hebrew – Israel
- Japanese – Japan
- Mongolian – Mongolia
- Korean – Korea

== Relevant theory ==
=== Optimality theory ===
One of the ways in which the production of a nominative–accusative case marking system can be explained is from an Optimality Theoretic perspective. Case marking is said to fulfill two functions, or constraints: an identifying function and a distinguishing function. The identifying function is exemplified when case morphology encodes (identifies) specific semantic, thematic, or pragmatic properties or information about the nominal argument. Accusative case in the position of the direct object, for example, can be a strong identifier of patienthood. The distinguishing function is used to distinguish between the core arguments, the subject and the object, of a transitive clause. Helen de Hoop and Andrej Malchukov explain the motivation and need for the distinguishing function in "Case marking strategies":

When a two-place predicate R(x,y) is used to describe an event involving two participants, usually an agent and a patient, it is of utmost importance to avoid ambiguity as to which noun phrase corresponds to the first argument x (the agent) and which to the second argument y (the patient). For this purpose, case can be used to mark one of the arguments. If one argument is case marked, this already suffices for the purpose of disambiguation. Thus, from the distinguishing perspective, there is no need to case mark both arguments. Neither would it be necessary to case mark the one and only argument of a one-place (intransitive) predicate. Indeed, it has been argued that in many nominative–accusative case systems only the y is case marked (with accusative case) while the x remains morphologically unmarked.

It is rare for case to serve only the distinguishing function, which overlaps greatly with the ‘identify’ function. Other ways of disambiguating the arguments of a transitive predicate (subject agreement, word order restriction, context, intonation, etc.) may explain this cross-linguistic observation. De Hoop and Malchukov argue that case systems that are completely based on the identification function must be richer in case morphology compared to languages based mainly on the distinguishing function.

=== Functional pressure ===
One theory that has been posited to account for the occurrence of accusative systems is that of functional pressure. When applied to languages, this theory operates around the various needs and pressures on a speech community. It has been suggested that languages have evolved to suit the needs of their users.These communities will develop some functional system to meet the needs that they have. So, it has been proposed that the accusative system arose from a functional pressure to avoid ambiguity and make communication a simpler process.

It is useful for languages to have a means of distinguishing between subjects and objects, and between arguments A, S, and O. This is helpful so that sentences like "Tom hit Fred" cannot be interpreted as "Fred hit Tom." Tripartite alignment systems accomplish this differentiation by coding S, A and O all differently. However, this is not structurally economical, and tripartite systems are comparatively rare, but to have all arguments marked the same makes the arguments too ambiguous. Alongside the principle of distinguishability seems to operate a principle of economy. It is more efficient to have as few cases as possible without compromising intelligibility. In this way the dual pressures of efficiency and economy have produced a system which patterns two kinds of arguments together a third separately. Both accusative and ergative systems use this kind of grouping to make meaning clearer.

== See also ==
- Accusative case
- Active language
- Case (grammar)
- Ergative–absolutive language
- Morphosyntactic alignment
- Nominative case

== Sources ==
- Bossong, Georg (16 April 1985). "Empirische Universalienforschung: Differentielle Objektmarkierung in den neuiranischen Sprachen". Ars Linguistica (in German). doi:10.5281/zenodo.4697660.
