= Transitive verb =

Verb that entails a transitive object

A transitive verb is a verb that entails one or more transitive objects, for example, 'enjoys' in Amadeus enjoys music. This contrasts with intransitive verbs, which do not entail transitive objects, for example, 'arose' in Beatrice arose.

Transitivity is traditionally thought of as a global property of a clause, by which activity is transferred from an agent to a patient.

Transitive verbs can be classified by the number of objects required. Verbs that entail only two arguments, a subject and a single direct object, are monotransitive. Verbs that entail two objects, a direct object and an indirect object, are called ditransitive, or less commonly bitransitive. To give is an example of a ditransitive verb in English: it may feature a subject, an indirect object, and a direct object: John gave Mary the book.

Verbs that take three objects are tritransitive. In English a tritransitive verb features an indirect object, a direct object, and a prepositional phrase – as in I'll trade you this bicycle for your binoculars – or else a clause that behaves like an argument – as in I bet you a pound that he has forgotten. Not all descriptive grammars recognize tritransitive verbs.

A clause with a prepositional phrase that expresses a meaning similar to that usually expressed by an object may be called pseudo-transitive. For example, the Indonesian sentences Dia masuk sekolah ("He attended school") and Dia masuk ke sekolah ("He went into the school") have the same verb (masuk "enter"), but the first sentence has a direct object while the second has a prepositional phrase in its place. A clause with a direct object plus a prepositional phrase may be called pseudo-ditransitive, as in the Lakhota sentence Haŋpíkčeka kiŋ lená wé-čage ("I made those moccasins for him"). Such constructions are sometimes called complex transitive. The category of complex transitives includes not only prepositional phrases but also dependent clauses, appositives, and other structures. There is some controversy regarding complex transitives and tritransitives; linguists disagree on the nature of the structures.

In contrast to transitive verbs, some verbs take zero objects. Verbs that do not require an object are called intransitive verbs. An example in modern English is the verb to arrive.

Verbs that can be used in an intransitive or transitive way are called ambitransitive verbs. In English, an example is the verb to eat; the sentences You eat (with an intransitive form) and You eat apples (a transitive form that has apples as the object) are both grammatical.

The concept of valency is related to transitivity. The valency of a verb considers all the arguments the verb takes, including both the subject and all of the objects. In contrast to valency, the transitivity of a verb only considers the objects. Subcategorization is roughly synonymous with valency, though they come from different theoretical traditions.

== History ==
Transitive phrases, i.e. phrases containing transitive verbs, were first recognized by the stoics and from the Peripatetic school, but they probably referred to the whole phrase containing the transitive verb, not just to the verb. The advancements of the stoics were later developed by the philologists of the Alexandrian school.

== Lexical vis-à-vis grammatical information ==
Traditionally, transitivity patterns are thought of as lexical information of the verb, but recent research in construction grammar and related theories has argued that transitivity is a grammatical rather than a lexical property, since the same verb very often appears with different transitivity in different contexts. Consider:

- Does your dog bite? (no object)
- The cat bit him. (one object)
- Can you bite me off a piece of banana? (two objects)
- The vase broke. (no object; anticausative construction)
- She broke the toothpick. (one object)
- Can you break me some toothpicks for my model castle? (two objects)
- Stop me before I buy again. (no object; antipassive construction)
- The man bought a ring. (one object)
- The man bought his wife a ring. (two objects)

In grammatical construction theories, transitivity is considered as an element of grammatical construction, rather than an inherent part of verbs.

== In English ==
The following sentences exemplify transitive verbs in English.

- We're going to need a bigger boat.
- You need to fill in this form.
- Hang on, I'll have it ready in a minute.
- The professor took off his spectacles.

== Other languages ==
In some languages, morphological features separate verbs based on their transitivity, which suggests this is a salient linguistic feature. For example, in Japanese:

授業 が 始まる。
Jugyō ga hajimaru.
The class starts.

先生 が 授業 を 始める。
Sensei ga jugyō o hajimeru.
The teacher starts the class.

However, the definition of transitive verbs as those with one object is not universal, and is not used in grammars of many languages.

=== In Hungarian ===
Hungarian is sometimes misunderstood to have transitive and intransitive conjugation for all verbs, but there is really only one general conjugation. In present and future, there is a lesser used variant – a definite, or say emphatic conjugation form. It is used only when referring to a previous sentence, or topic, where the object was already mentioned. Logically the definite article a(z) as reference is used here—and due to verb emphasis (definite), word order changes to VO.

- If one does not want to be definite, once can simply say:

házat látok — I see (a) house – (general)

látom a házat — I see the house – (The house we were looking for)

almát eszem — I eat (an) apple – (general)

eszem az almát — I eat the apple – (The one mom told me to)

bort iszom — I drink wine – (general)

iszom a bort — I drink the wine – (That you offered me before)

In English, one would say 'I do see the house', etc., stressing the verb – in Hungarian, the object is emphasized – but both mean exactly the same thing.

=== In Pingelapese ===
In the Pingelapese language, transitive verbs are used in one of four of the most common sentence structures. Transitive verbs according to this language have two main characteristics. These characteristics are action verbs and the sentence must contain a direct object. To elaborate, an action verb is a verb that has a physical action associated to its meaning. The sentence must contain a direct object meaning there must be a recipient of said verb. Two entities must be involved when using a transitive sentence. There is also a fixed word order associated with transitive sentences: subject-transitive verb-object. For example:

Linda (Subject) e aesae (transitive verb) Adino (object) This sentence translates to, Linda knows Adino.

=== In Polish ===
It is generally accepted in Polish grammar that transitive verbs are those that:

- Entail a direct object (which is in the accusative, or, for a few verbs, instrumental case in non-negated sentences, and in the genitive case in negated sentences)
  OR
- Can undergo passive transformation

For example, the verb widzieć (to see) is transitive because it satisfies both conditions:

Maria widzi Jana (Mary sees John; Jana is the accusative form of Jan)
Jan jest widziany przez Marię (John is seen by Mary)

== See also ==
- Morphosyntactic alignment
