= Japanese potential form conjugation (mizenkei base) =

Japanese conjugation, like the conjugation of verbs of many other languages, allows verbs to be morphologically modified to change their meaning or grammatical function. In Japanese, the beginning of a word (the stem) is preserved during conjugation, while the ending of the word is altered in some way to change the meaning (this is the inflectional suffix). Japanese verb conjugations are independent of person, number and gender (they do not depend on whether the subject is I, you, he, she, we, etc.); the conjugated forms can express meanings such as negation, present and past tense, volition, passive voice, causation, imperative and conditional mood, and ability. There are also special forms for conjunction with other verbs, and for combination with particles for additional meanings.

Japanese verbs have agglutinating properties: some of the conjugated forms are themselves conjugable verbs (or i-adjectives), which can result in several suffixes being strung together in a single verb form to express a combination of meanings.

A revision sheet visually summarizing the conjugations and uses described below

Conjugable words (verbs, i‑adjectives, and na‑adjectives) are traditionally considered to have six possible conjugational stems or bases (活用形, katsuyōkei; literally "conjugation forms"). This article lists those from the negative base (未然形, mizenkei), as well as the tentative base (推量形/意思形, suiryōkei/ishikei) that was split off during the post‑WWII spelling reforms.

Potentiality (可能, kanō) describes the possibility for an action to happen, whether it involves an intentional acting agent or not:

- With a capable agent: Kare wa yakyū ga dekiru (彼は野球ができる; lit. 'Him? Baseball is possible', transl. He can play baseball)
- Without a capable agent:
  - Kosame nara undōkai ga dekiru (小雨なら運動会ができる; lit. 'Provided that it drizzles, the sports day is possible', transl. The sports day can still happen if it only drizzles)
  - Kono sake wa nakanaka ikeru (この酒はなかなかいける; lit. 'This liquor? It can go very much', transl. This liquor is very good)

== Potential ==
The patient of an action is customarily marked with the nominative particle ga (rather than the accusative o), which has the same appearance as the passive voice:

- Active: A ga P o taberu (AがPを食べる; 'A eats P')
  - Pure passive: A ni P ga taberareru (AにPが食べられる; 'P is eaten by A')
  - Passive potential: A ni/ga P ga/o taberareru (Aに・がPが・を食べられる; 'P can be eaten by A → A can eat P')

It is not impossible to use A ga P o taberareru (AがPを食べられる; ni and o do not occur together for the potential) instead in the passive potential above, but it is less preferable in this case. However, o is more preferable to ga in the presence of a motion verb (whose pure passive does not naturally occur):

- Active: A ga koko o tōru (Aがここを通る; 'A passes this place')
  - ~~Pure passive: A ni B ga tōrareru (Aにここが通られる; 'this place is passed by A')~~
  - Potential: A ga B o tōreru (Aがここを通れる; 'A can pass this place')

The rise of the particle ga as a marker of the patient of the action can be attributed to the "spontaneous (or natural) passive (or potential)" (自発, jihatsu), whereby the patient or the action simply comes about, seemingly in a vacuum, without a voluntary or intentional agent acting on it. This may also relate to the verb dekiru (出来る) (see the phrase koto ga dekiru mentioned below) which means "come about; come into existence; materialize; form; take shape; be done/made/born/produced → be doable/feasible/possible", as in kome ga dekita (米ができた; transl. the rice was produced), kutsu ga dekita (靴ができた; transl. the shoes were made), kodomo ga dekita (子供ができた; transl. a child was born), etc. Thus, such phrase as shōsetsu ga kaketa (小説が書けた), spoken in the past tense by an author who does not want to mention themself as an agent, can be translated as "the novel wrote itself" (= the novel came about in written form), rather than "I was able to write the novel". Other examples without voluntary agents include shizen ni waraete kita (自然に笑えてきた; transl. I was seized by laughter = laughter spontaneously occurred to me), hontō no yō ni omoete kita (本当のように思えてきた; transl. it began to appear true = the thought of it being true occurred to me), nakete kichatta (泣けてきちゃった; transl. I couldn't help crying = crying unfortunately occurred to me), tsureta (釣れた; transl. I've got one = a fish's caught itself on my line), etc.

== Potential form example sentences ==
Potential form example sentences
English	Japanese	Function
"I can still shoot a bow and arrow." She winked. "Skin a deer. Track a cougar." She leaned closer. "Use a bowie knife."	"Ima de mo yumiya wa ireru wa yo" Tesu wa uinku shita. "Shika no kawa mo hagaseru shi, kūgā no ashiato mo oeru wa" kanojo wa Matto no hō e mi o yoseta. "Boui naifu mo tsukaeru shi ne" (「いまでも弓矢は射れるわよ」テスはウインクした。「鹿の皮も剥がせるし、クーガーの足跡も追えるわ」彼女はマットのほうへ身をよせた。「ボウイナイフも使えるしね」)	capabilitative potentiality (能力可能, nōryoku kanō; an agent is (in)capable of doing something)
Leticia Dartois can read minds.	Retishia Darutowa wa kokoro ga yomeru. (レティシア・ダルトワは心が読める。)	capabilitative potentiality (能力可能, nōryoku kanō; an agent is (in)capable of doing something)
Nobody can read my hand but my brother there—so he copies for me.	Watashi no ji o yomeru no wa, koko no watashi no otōto dake de――watashi no seisho o shite kureru no desu. (私の字を読めるのは、ここの私の弟だけで――私の清書をしてくれるのです。)	capabilitative potentiality (能力可能, nōryoku kanō; an agent is (in)capable of doing something)
Still, English or no, Galen could not justify simply attacking the party and killing the woman.	To ieba, Ingurando musume de arō ga nakarō ga, sono ikkō ni kishū o kake, MaGuregā no hanayome to naru musume o korosu koto ni seigi ga aru to wa, Geiran ni wa omoenakatta. (といえば、イングランド娘であろうがなかろうが、その一行に奇襲をかけ、マグレガーの花嫁となる娘を殺すことに正義があるとは、ゲイランには思えなかった。)	capabilitative potentiality (能力可能, nōryoku kanō; an agent is (in)capable of doing something)
This novel is very readable. (Note: This novel is very enjoyable to read.)	Kono shōsetsu wa nakanaka yomeru (この小説はなかなか読める)	circumstantial potentiality (状況可能, jōkyō kanō; something can(not) happen because of external circumstance)
His handwriting is messy and completely illegible.	Ano hito wa ji ga kitanakute yoku yomenai (あの人は字が汚くてよく読めない)	circumstantial potentiality (状況可能, jōkyō kanō; something can(not) happen because of external circumstance)
You can't read at a place this noisy.	Konna yakamashii tokoro de wa, hon nado wa yomenai (こんなやかましい処では、本などは読めない)	circumstantial potentiality (状況可能, jōkyō kanō; something can(not) happen because of external circumstance)
"I wanna pick some edible stuff on the mountain. […]" […] "Well, how 'bout we go pick edible plants together by the river?" […] Oh crap, it'd be so weird if out of nowhere a one‑year‑old girl could tell if a plant is edible or not! […] While we were looking, I found a lot more edible plants than expected. Dandelions, watercress, dropwort, mugwort. […] I knew dandelions were edible in my previous life, but never thought of eating them for real.	"Yama de, taberareru mono o toritai no. […]" […] "Sore jā, kawa no chikaku no tabereru kusa o issho ni, torō?" […] Sō yo ne, totsuzen issai no onna no ko ga, kono kusa, tabereru taberenai to ka ittara kowai yo ne! […] Sagashite miru to, angai taberareru yasō wa ōkatta. Tanpopo, kureson, seri, yomogi. […] Tanpopo tte tabereru n dā to, zense no watashi wa omotte ita ga, jissai ni tabeyō to wa omowanakatta. (「やまで、たべられるものをとりたいの。[…]」 […] 「それじゃー、かわのちかくのたべれる草をいっしょに、とろー？」 […] そうよね、突然一歳の女の子が、この草、食べれる・食べれないとか言ったら怖いよね！ […] 探してみると、案外食べられる野草は多かった。タンポポ、クレソン、セリ、ヨモギ。[…]タンポポって食べれるんだーと、前世の私は思っていたが、実際に食べようとは思わなかった。)	circumstantial potentiality (状況可能, jōkyō kanō; something can(not) happen because of external circumstance)
Before I knew it, it was already written. (Note: It seemingly wrote itself.)	Itsu no ma ni ka kakete shimatta (いつのまにか書けてしまった)	spontaneity / natural potentiality (自発・自然可能, jihatsu / shizen kanō; something seemingly spontaneously comes about)
Try as she might to hold back, tears just start to flow. (Note: She's overcome by an act of crying.)	Koraete mo, shizen ni nakete kuru (こらえても、自然に泣けてくる)	spontaneity / natural potentiality (自発・自然可能, jihatsu / shizen kanō; something seemingly spontaneously comes about)
The fish were biting like crazy. (Note: The fish seemingly fished themselves.)	Omoshiroi hodo yoku tsureta (おもしろいほどよく釣れた)	spontaneity / natural potentiality (自発・自然可能, jihatsu / shizen kanō; something seemingly spontaneously comes about)
Stealing MacGregor's bride had seemed the perfect solution to Galen at the time. […] Aye, except for her being English it had seemed the perfect solution . . . right up until he had seen how puny and frail she appeared. (Note: The thought occurred → it seemed.)	MaGuregā no hanayome o ryakudatsu suru. Kono keikaku wa, Geiran ni wa kanpeki na kaiketsu hōhō ni omoeta. […] Jissai, sono musume ga Ingurando-jin da to yū koto o nozokeba, kore wa jitsu ni mōshibun no nai kaiketsu hōhō ni omoeta. (マグレガーの花嫁を略奪する。この計画は、ゲイランには完璧な解決方法に思えた。[…] 実際、その娘がイングランド人だということを除けば、これは実に申しぶんのない解決方法に思えた。)	spontaneity / natural potentiality (自発・自然可能, jihatsu / shizen kanō; something seemingly spontaneously comes about)

== Potential: Conjugation table ==
Potential verbs are unique to godan‑based passive potential verbs, which have been said to have been shortened by removing ar from areru: yom~~ar~~eru (読まれる; 'be read; can read') → yomeru (読める; 'can read'); kak~~ar~~eru (書かれる; 'be written; can write') → kakeru (書ける; 'can write'). Other hypotheses of derivation include contractions from infinitives followed by eru (得る; 'get', see Japanese conjugation (ren'yōkei base)#Infinitive: Grammatical compatibility), presumably as in kakieru (書きえる; 'can write') → kakeru; or conversions of nidan attributives into ichidan potentials, such as kiruru → kireru (切るる→切れる), shiruru → shireru (知るる→知れる). Short potential verbs of this type are conventional in Tokyo Japanese, while long verbs have become largely obsolescent, elevated or non‑Tokyo.

The hypothetical short potential verb *wakareru (分かれる; 'can make sense') is not used. However, the non‑potential intransitive wakareru (分かれる; 'branch off'), the adversative passive wakarareru (分かられる; 'suffer because it makes sense') and causative wakaraseru (分からせる; 'cause it to make sense') are acceptable.

Non‑godan‑based verbs such as taberareru (食べられる; 'can eat; be eaten') remain ambiguous. Such ambiguity can be resolved, at least colloquially, by a process dubbed ra‑nuki kotoba (ら抜き言葉; lit. 'ra‑less word'), thus distinguishing the short tabe~~ra~~reru → tabereru (食べ~~ら~~れる→食べれる; 'can eat') for the potential and the long taberareru (食べられる; 'be eaten') for the passive. This process was originally dialectal, but has been increasingly adopted by Tokyo speakers. Preference polls have shown that even among ra‑nuki kotoba users, the likelihood of usage significantly decreases as the mora count in the verb stem exceeds two; in other words, mi.re.ru (見れる; one-mora stem) and ta.be.re.ru (食べれる; two-mora stem) are highly likely, but shi.n.ji.re.ru (信じれる; three-mora stem), ka.n.ga.e.re.ru (考えれる; four-mora stem), o.to.shi.i.re.re.ru (陥れれる; five-mora stem) are much less likely.

Shortening passive verbs for potential uses is not universal among dialects, some of which may only use long verbs instead.

Apart from the dedicated potential verbs, the less ambiguous but more circumlocutory phrase koto ga dekiru (ことができる) can be used, as in iku koto ga dekiru (行くことができる; 'can go'), yameru koto ga dekiru (止めることができる; 'can stop'), etc. Depending on usage, a particle such as wa, mo or no can be used instead of ga. Some potential verbs, such as nomeru (飲める; 'can drink; can be drunk; is drinkable'), kueru (喰える; 'can eat; can be eaten; is eatable'), etc., have meanings similar to those of ‑able adjectives in English, such as drinkable/potable, eatable/edible, etc., which describe the patient's quality to be enjoyed by the agent, not the agent's capability of enjoying the patient; these verbs are not completely interchangeable with koto ga dekiru; compare Kono sake wa dō mo nomenai. (この酒はどうも飲めない。; transl. This liquor is so undrinkable. (=it tastes awful, or is not fit for drinking)) and Kono sake wa dō mo nomu koto ga dekinai. (この酒はどうも飲むことができない。; transl. It seems I can't drink this liquor. (=I'm incapable of drinking, or I can't afford to drink)).

Most contemporary ‑suru verbs do not really have underlying potential verbs and must use suru koto ga dekiru, which can be shortened to dekiru only for Group‑A verbs. Thus, yasuku (suru koto ga) dekiru (安く(することが)できる; 'can make cheap'), benkyō (suru koto ga) dekiru (勉強(することが)できる; 'can study'), onegai (suru koto ga) dekiru (お願い(することが)できる; 'can request'); but nessuru koto ga dekiru (熱することができる; 'can heat'), kyōsuru koto ga dekiru (供することができる; 'can offer'), etc cannot be reduced to *neddekiru, *kyōdekiru, etc, and must be used in full. Treating dekiru as a shortening of koto ga dekiru explains why dekiru can be used with the accusative particle o instead of the nominative ga, as suru is perfectly compatible with o: Tada de Yōroppa o/ga kenbutsu dekiru nante, subarashii ja nai? (ただでヨーロッパを・が見物できるなんて、素晴らしいじゃない？; transl. Isn't it swell to be able to see Europe free?'). Historically, the passive potential sareru, serareru and shirareru were seldom used for Group‑A verbs, but they have been supplanted by (suru koto ga) dekiru, which figured in a trend towards disambiguating the polysemous passive potential during the Meiji era. Non‑Group‑A verbs, which have become more like godan (partially or completely), do have potential verbs, such as aiseru (愛せる; 'can love') (short)/aisareru (愛される; 'can love; be loved') (long), nakuseru (無くせる; 'can lose')/nakusareru (無くされる; 'can lose; be lost'), etc; or more like ichidan, although probably without ra‑nuki kotoba, as in ōjirareru/ōzerareru (応じられる・応ぜられる; 'can respond'), or with it, as in shinjireru (信じれる; 'can believe').

Writers can make use of various ways to convey potentiality, such as how Natsume Sōseki used a short potential verb (aisezu), a long passive potential verb (irarenai), koto + particle + dekiru (hirogete dakishimeru koto no dekinai) and eru/uru (aishiuru) in the same sentence in the novel Kokoro: Ningen o aishiuru hito, aisezu ni wa irarenai hito, sore de ite jibun no futokoro ni irō to suru mono o, te o hirogete dakishimeru koto no dekinai hito,――kore ga sensei de atta. (人間を愛し得る人、愛せずにはゐられない人、それでゐて自分の懷に入らうとするものを、手をひろげて抱き締める事の出來ない人、――是が先生であつた。; transl. A person who could love, a person who could not be without being able to love, yet a person who was incapable of opening his arms and embracing someone trying to get into his heart,――that was Sensei.); or how Miyahara Kōichirō used koto + particle + dekiru (shinu koto no dekinai, nete iru koto no dekinai), and both the long passive potential (shinareru) and short potential (shinenai) of the same verb in his translation of Kierkegaard's Either/Or: Naze ka to ieba, shinenai mono wa saidai fukōmono de, shinareru mono wa kōfukumono de aru kara da. (卽ち、死ぬことの出來ない人、[…]墓に寢てゐることの出來ない人は最大不幸の人であるから。で、話は解決がついて、答へは容易になつた。なぜかと言へば、死ねない者は最大不幸者で、死なれる者は幸福者であるからだ。)|Sunawachi, shinu koto no dekinai hito, […] haka ni nete iru koto no dekinai hito wa saidai fukō no hito de aru kara. De, hanashi wa kaiketsu ga tsuite, kotae wa yōi ni natta. Naze ka to ieba, shinenai mono wa saidai fukōmono de, shinareru mono wa kōfukumono de aru kara da.|transl. To wit, he who could not die, could not lie in a grave, was the unhappiest man. Thus, the case would be settled, the answer simple, for the unhappiest man was he who could not die, and happy he who could.}}

Dictionary form	Pattern			Potential form
Godan and pseudo‑yodan verbs
結う (yuu/yū, fasten)	結う	結え	る	結える (yueru, can fasten / can be fastened / be fastenable)
言(い)う (yū, say)	ゆう	いえ	る	言える (ieru, can say / can be said / be sayable)
勝つ (katsu, win)	勝つ	勝て	る	勝てる (kateru, can win)
狩る (karu, hunt)	狩る	狩れ	る	狩れる (kareru, can hunt / can be hunted / be huntable)
貸す (kasu, lend)	貸す	貸せ	る	貸せる (kaseru, can lend / can be lended / be lendable)
愛す (aisu, love)	愛す	愛せ	る	愛せる (aiseru, can love / can be loved / be lovable)
達す (tassu, reach)	達す	達せ	る	達せる (tasseru, can reach / can be reached / be reachable)
書く (kaku, write)	書く	書け	る	書ける (kakeru, can write / can be written / be writable)
嗅ぐ (kagu, smell)	嗅ぐ	嗅げ	る	嗅げる (kageru, can smell / can be smelled / be smellable)
呼ぶ (yobu, call)	呼ぶ	呼べ	る	呼べる (yoberu, can call / can be called / be callable)
読む (yomu, read)	読む	読め	る	読める (yomeru, can read / can be read / be readable/legible)
死ぬ (shinu, die)	死ぬ	死ね	る	死ねる (shineru, can die)
Ichidan verbs
見る (miru, look)	見~~る~~	見	(ら)れる	見(ら)れる (mi(ra)reru, can look / can be seen / be seeable/viewable/watchable/visible)
達しる (tasshiru, reach)	達し~~る~~	達し 達せ	(ら)れる	達し(ら)れる (tasshi(ra)reru, can reach / can be reached / be reachable) 達せ(ら)れる (tasse(ra)reru)
察しる (sasshiru, guess)	察し~~る~~	察し 察せ	(ら)れる	察し(ら)れる (sasshi(ra)reru, can guess / can be guessed / be guessable) 察せ(ら)れる (sasse(ra)reru)
信じる (shinjiru, believe)	信じ~~る~~	信じ 信ぜ	(ら)れる	信じ(ら)れる (shinji(ra)reru, can believe / can be believed / be believable/trustable) 信ぜ(ら)れる (shinze(ra)reru)
進ぜる (shinzeru, give)	進ぜ~~る~~	進ぜ	(ら)れる	進ぜ(ら)れる (shinze(ra)reru, can give / can be given / be givable)
出る (deru, exit)	出~~る~~	出	(ら)れる	出(ら)れる (de(ra)reru, can exit)
Irregular verbs
する (suru, do)	する	できる		出来る (dekiru, can do / can be done / be doable/feasible)
勉強する (benkyō suru, study)	勉強する	勉強できる		勉強できる (benkyō dekiru, can study / can be studied / be studiable)
愛する (aisuru, love)	愛す~~る~~	愛せ	る	愛せる (aiseru, can love / can be loved / be lovable)
達する (tassuru, reach)	達す~~る~~	達せ	る	達せる (tasseru, can reach / can be reached / be reachable)
達する (tassuru, reach)	達す~~る~~	達せ 達し	(ら)れる	達せ(ら)れる (tasse(ra)reru, can reach / can be reached / be reachable) 達し(ら)れる (tasshi(ra)reru)
察する (sassuru, guess)	察す~~る~~	察せ 察し	(ら)れる	察せ(ら)れる (sasse(ra)reru, can guess / can be guessed / be guessable) 察し(ら)れる (sasshi(ra)reru)
信ずる (shinzuru, believe)	信ず~~る~~	信ぜ 信じ	(ら)れる	信ぜ(ら)れる (shinze(ra)reru, can believe / can be believed / be believable/trustable) 信じ(ら)れる (shinji(ra)reru)
進ずる (shinzuru, give)	進ず~~る~~	進ぜ 進じ	(ら)れる	進ぜ(ら)れる (shinze(ra)reru, can give / can be given / be givable) 進じ(ら)れる (shinji(ra)reru)
来る (kuru, come)	く~~る~~	こ	(ら)れる	来(ら)れる (ko(ra)reru, can come)

== Potential: Grammatical compatibility ==
A potential verb is an ichidan verb, and can be conjugated further mostly in the same way an ichidan verb can be, although it may resist the imperative due to semantic difficulty.

== See also ==
- Japanese negative form
- Japanese passive form
- Japanese causative form
- Japanese hortative form
