= Japanese causative form conjugation (mizenkei base) =

Japanese conjugation, like the conjugation of verbs of many other languages, allows verbs to be morphologically modified to change their meaning or grammatical function. In Japanese, the beginning of a word (the stem) is preserved during conjugation, while the ending of the word is altered in some way to change the meaning (this is the inflectional suffix). Japanese verb conjugations are independent of person, number and gender (they do not depend on whether the subject is I, you, he, she, we, etc.); the conjugated forms can express meanings such as negation, present and past tense, volition, passive voice, causation, imperative and conditional mood, and ability. There are also special forms for conjunction with other verbs, and for combination with particles for additional meanings.

Japanese verbs have agglutinating properties: some of the conjugated forms are themselves conjugable verbs (or i-adjectives), which can result in several suffixes being strung together in a single verb form to express a combination of meanings.

A revision sheet visually summarizing the conjugations and uses described below

Conjugable words (verbs, i‑adjectives, and na‑adjectives) are traditionally considered to have six possible conjugational stems or bases (活用形, katsuyōkei; literally "conjugation forms"). This article lists those from the negative base (未然形, mizenkei), as well as the tentative base (推量形/意思形, suiryōkei/ishikei) that was split off during the post‑WWII spelling reforms.

Causativity (使役, shieki) expresses how an instigator causes an agent to do something, whether by making or letting the agent (A) do it. The instigator (I) is marked with the nominative ga, while the agent is customarily marked with either ni or o depending on the original verb's transitivity:

- Active with an intransitive verb: A ga kuru (Aが来る; 'A comes')
  - Causative: I ga A o kosaseru (IがAを来させる; 'I has A come')
- Active with a transitive verb: A ga P o yobu (AがPを呼ぶ; 'A calls P')
  - Causative: I ga A ni P o yobaseru (IがAにPを呼ばせる; 'I has A call P')

== Causative ==
For some speakers, the agent can be marked with ni even with an intransitive verb, which is possibly intended to mean "I lets A come" rather than "I makes A come"; or marked with o even with a transitive verb, despite the presence of the other o marking the patient (P). This means that the presence of the particle o does not guarantee clear meaning, for example in ushi o tabesaseru (牛を食べさせる; 'has the cow eat; has someone eat the cow'), Tarō o mataseru (太郎を待たせる; 'has Tarō wait; has someone wait for Tarō'). In more elevated text, the agent can be marked with o shite instead of just o.

== Causative form example sentences ==
Causative form example sentences
English	Japanese	Function
I had one of my staff attend the conference.	Kaigi ni wa buka o shusseki saseta (会議には部下を出席させた)	compulsion ("make do")
"You had him killed—hired Whidden and then didn't pay him. […]"	"Kimi wa kare o korosaseta no da――tsumari Hoiddon o yatotte korosaseta no da ga, sono toki kimi wa kare ni harawanakatta. […]" (「君は彼を殺させたのだ――つまりホイッドンを雇って殺させたのだが、そのとき君は彼に払わなかった。[…]」)	compulsion ("make do")
She disappeared down the passage while Ash soaked and resoaked the T‑shirt, being careful not to touch the doe's burns with it as he ran water over them. (Note: He made water drip.) […] He gave her another drink of water and tried to coax the fawn into taking one and failed. (Note: He let?/made? the doe drink water, and tried to make the fawn drink.)	Kanojo ga tsūro no saki ni kieta ato, Asshu wa tīshatsu o nando mo mizu ni hitashi, sore ga mejika no yakedo ni chokusetsu furenai yō chūi shinagara, mizu o shitataraseta. […] Asshu wa mejika ni mata mizu o nomase, kojika ni mo nomaseyō to shite nadamesukashita ga, shippai ni owatta. (彼女が通路の先に消えたあと、アッシュはＴシャツを何度も水に浸し、それが雌鹿の火傷に直接触れないよう注意しながら、水を滴らせた。[…]アッシュは雌鹿にまた水を飲ませ、子鹿にも飲ませようとしてなだめすかしたが、失敗に終わった。)	compulsion ("make do")
Drinkers might use various tactics to try and claw you back. (Note: Drinkers might plot to make you drink alcohol by using every strategy there is.)	Dorinkā-tachi wa arayuru senryaku o tsukatte, anata ni osake o nomasō to kakusaku suru deshō. (ドリンカーたちはあらゆる戦略を使って、あなたにお酒を飲まそうと画策するでしょう。)	compulsion ("make do")
That discovery made him famous. (Note: That discovery made?/let? him make a name for himself.)	Sono hakken ga kare ni na o nasashimeru koto ni natta (その発見が彼に名をなさしめることになった)	compulsion ("make do")
As soon as he got the greenlight for marriage, Balghed exuded such vitality that doctors would put on the same level as cockroaches, and climbed his way out the chasm of death. (Note: He exuded vitality to the extent that doctors would make to say "cockroach level.")	Kekkon no shōdaku o eta Barugeddo wa isha ga gokiburi reberu to iwashimeru hodo no seimeiryoku o hakki shi, shi no fuchi kara yomigaette miseta. (結婚の承諾を得たバルゲッドは医者がゴキブリレベルと言わしめるほどの生命力を発揮し、死の淵から蘇ってみせた。)	compulsion ("make do")
If you ask me, that there is the major difference. (Note: "If you make me say." Iwashimureba is the nidan provisional equivalent to iwashimereba, used here for literary flair.)	Boku o shite iwashimureba, koko ni koso hijō na sōi ga aru no desu. (僕をして言わしむれば、ここにこそ非常な相違があるのです。)	compulsion ("make do")
If you ask me, I'd say Nagano is the easiest city to live in in Japan.	Watashi o shite iwashimeru naraba, Nagano wa Nihon de ichiba sumiyasui toshi de aru (私をして言わしめるならば, 長野は日本で一番住みやすい都市である)	compulsion ("make do")
The young republic sought its chief merit, not in instilling fear, but rather in being itself in incessant fear, (Note: It sought its chief merit not in making people fear.)	Wakaki kyōwa seiji wa, kyōfu seshimeru koto yori mo, mushiro taezu mizukara kyōfu shi, (若き共和政治は、恐怖せしめることよりも、むしろ絕えずみずから恐怖し、)	compulsion ("make do")
while all the time Nature is inviting you to talk earnestly with her, to understand her, to subdue her, and to be blessed by her! (Note: "But now look at the Great Nature. All the time she is beckoning you and trying to make you exchange earnest talks with herself, understand herself, subdue herself, and earn bliss from herself." The object of the causatives, also the agent of the underlying actions, is nanji ("you"), marked with o shite. The other words marked with the other o's are the objects and patients of the actions.)	Shikaru ni ippō Daishizen o miyo. Shizen wa nanji o shite onore (Shizen) to nesshin ni hanashi o kawasashimen to shite, onore o rikai seshimen to shite, onore o seifuku seshimen to shite, kakute onore yori kōfuku o toku seshimen to shite, tsune ni nanji o oide oide to maneite iru no de aru. (然るに一方大自然を見よ。自然は汝をして己れ（自然）と熱心に話をかわさしめんとして，己れを理解せしめんとして，己れを征服せしめんとして，かくて己れより幸福を得せしめんとして，常に汝を御出で御出でと招いて居るのである。)	compulsion ("make do")
In summer we used to run a shallow bath and let the children play in it.	Natsu wa ofuro ni asaku mizu o hatte kodomo o asobaseta mono da (夏はお風呂に浅く水を張って子供を遊ばせたものだ)	permission ("let do")
I fed the botched pizza to my dog. (Note: I let?/made? my dog eat the botched pizza.)	Dekisonatta piza wa inu ni tabesaseta (出来損なったピザは犬に食べさせた)	permission ("let do")
* In winter, even when a woman is breastfeeding her child in the corner of the bounds of a field, you are not obliged to think that her chest is made of rubber and her child of cardboard. (Note: A woman is letting?/making? her child drink her milk.)	* Fuyu, hatake no kyōkai no katasumi de, hitori no onna ga kodomo ni chichi o nomasete ita kara tote, sono mune wa gomu-sei de ari, kodomo wa atsugami-zaiku da to kangaeneba naranu to yū hō wa nai. (＊冬、畑の境界の片隅で、一人の女が子供に乳を飮ませてゐたからとて、その胸はゴム製であり、子供は厚紙細工だと考へねばならぬといふ法はない。)	permission ("let do")
"Mimir, I wish to enrich my wisdom even more. Please let me drink the water from your spring." "Do you wish to drink the water from this spring so much? I cannot let you drink it so easily," Mimir said.	"Mimīru yo, washi wa motto chishiki o tomasetai no da. Dō ka, kimi no izumi no mizu o nomashite kure" "Sonna ni kono izumi no mizu ga nomitai no ka. Da ga, yōi na koto de wa nomashite yarenai zo" to, Mimīru wa itta. (「ミミールよ、わしはもっと知識を富ませたいのだ。どうか、きみの泉の水を飲ましてくれ」 「そんなにこの泉の水が飲みたいのか。だが、容易なことでは飲ましてやれないぞ」と、ミミールはいった。)	permission ("let do")
It rustles and swells and sways and ripples and laps and lets pizzicati be heard, like sun flashes on the surface of waves. And it lets strange melody fragments and the sweet song "Lockt Dich der tiefe Himmel nicht, das feuchtverklärte Blau?" […] be heard.	Sore wa sawasawa to nari, namidachi, yureugoki, hamon o arawashi, hitahita to oto shi, nami no omo ni kagayaku taiyō no senkō no gotoki bachioto […] o kikaseru. So shite bimyō na senritsu no danpen to "Kano fukaki ten wa nanji o ugokasazaru ka, kano nurete kagayakeru hekikū wa" […] naru kanbi na uta o kikoeshimeru. (それはさは〱と鳴り、波立ち、搖れ動き、波紋をあらはし、ひた〱と音し、波の面に輝く太陽の閃光の如き撥音 […] を聽かせる。そして微妙な旋律の斷片と「かの深き天は汝を動さざるか、かの濡れて耀ける碧空は」 […] なる甘美な歌をきこえしめる。)	permission ("let do")
"Let him who wants to paint me," (Note: "It is good to let the one who wants to paint paint me." Kakasuru is the nidan attributive equivalent to kakaseru, used here in an otherwise relatively modern sentence as a faux archaism.)	"Kakitai to omou mono ni wa washi o kakasuru ga ii" (『描きたいと思ふ者には私を描かするが好い』)	permission ("let do")

=== Causative: Conjugation table ===
The causative form is created by using the mizenkei base, followed by the ichidan ‑(sa)seru ((さ)せる) suffix. Colloquially, the shorter godan ‑(sa)su ((さ)す; godan) can be used, but this may cause confusion among verbs with virtually identical forms, especially those that happen to end in ‑su already. Compare the causatives of the intransitive ugoku (動く; 'it moves') and its historically derived transitive ugokasu (動かす; 'he moves it'), the latter of which happens to resemble the godan causative ugokasu, as well as their (passive) potentials:

	(Passive) potential	Causative		
	(Passive) potential		Ichidan causative	Godan causative
Intransitive: 'it moves' ugoku	'it can move' ugokeru ugokareru	'she causes it to move'	ugokaseru	ugokasu
Intransitive: 'it moves' ugoku	'it can move' ugokeru ugokareru	(Passive) potential: 'it can be caused to move; she can cause it to move'	ugokase(ra)reru	ugokaseru ugokasareru
Transitive: 'he moves it' ugokasu	'it can be moved; he can move it' ugokaseru ugokasareru	'she causes him to move it'	ugokasaseru	ugokasasu
Transitive: 'he moves it' ugokasu	'it can be moved; he can move it' ugokaseru ugokasareru	(Passive) potential: 'he can be caused to move it; she can cause him to move it'	ugokasase(ra)reru	ugokasaseru ugokasasareru

In classical Japanese, ‑(sa)su was the nidan ancestor of the modern ichidan ‑(sa)seru; it became yodan sometime during Late Middle Japanese. A survey found that respondents were more likely to use ‑(sa)su, which is now godan, over ‑(sa)seru, if the original verb was already godan.

The causative of the verb matsu (待つ; 'wait') is mataseru (待たせる; 'make wait'), whose infinitive matase can be nominalized in the polite construction o‑ + <infinitive> + suru to form omatase shimashita (lit. 'I have kept you waiting') (Note: Alternatively, with itasu (致す; 'do') to form omatase itashimashita.) as an apology for being late or having kept someone waiting, (Note: The apology can be made explicit with omatase shite sumimasen deshita (お待たせしてすみませんでした; lit. 'I have not gotten away with keeping you waiting') or omatase shite mōshiwake arimasen deshita (お待たせして申し訳ありませんでした; lit. 'there was no excuse for my having kept you waiting').) and which can be idiomatically shortened to omatase.

One of the negative forms of araseru (あらせる; 'let exist'), arasezu (あらせず; 'not letting exist'), as in itoma mo arasezu (いとまもあらせず; 'not letting any spare time exist → not letting them have any spare time'), has been attested. De araseru (であらせる; 'make be; let be') has also been used.

The causatives of honorific verbs do not seem to occur, although at least one author has artificially used nasaraseta (なさらせた) in their literal translations of Amdo Tibetan honorific causatives.

Saseru (させる; 'make/let do') has been said to be shortened from sesaseru (せさせる), or even shisaseru (しさせる).

The pseudo‑classical causative makes use of ‑shimeru (〜しめる) instead of ‑(sa)seru as shown above. It has ichidan conjugation, and it is meant to emulate the true classical causative with ‑shimu which has nidan conjugation. As a pseudo‑classical auxiliary, ‑shimeru combines only with classical irrealis forms, which in most cases are not different from modern ones; but in the case of suru which has three irrealis forms, only the classical se‑ is used as in seshimeru, not *sashimeru nor *shishimeru. There exists a causative form for the copular taru (← to aru, 'be known as') that is tarashimeru, as in ningen o ningen tarashimeru jōken (人間を人間たらしめる条件; 'conditions that make humans human').

Dictionary form	Pattern			Causative form
Godan and pseudo‑yodan verbs
結う (yuu/yū, fasten)	結う	結わ	せる す しめる	結わせる (yuwaseru, cause to fasten) 結わす (yuwasu) 結わしめる (yuwashimeru)
言(い)う (yū, say)	ゆう	いわ	せる す しめる	言わせる (iwaseru, cause to say) 言わす (iwasu) 言わしめる (iwashimeru)
言(い)う (yū, say)	ゆう	ゆわ	せる す	言わせる (yuwaseru, cause to say) 言わす (yuwasu)
勝つ (katsu, win)	勝つ	勝た	せる す しめる	勝たせる (kataseru, cause to win) 勝たす (katasu) 勝たしめる (katashimeru)
狩る (karu, hunt)	狩る	狩ら	せる す しめる	狩らせる (karaseru, cause to hunt) 狩らす (karasu) 狩らしめる (karashimeru)
有る (aru, exist)	有る	有ら	せる す しめる	有らせる (araseru, cause to exist) 有らす (arasu) 有らしめる (arashimeru)
貸す (kasu, lend)	貸す	貸さ	せる す しめる	貸させる (kasaseru, cause to lend) 貸さす (kasasu) 貸さしめる (kasashimeru)
愛す (aisu, love)	愛す	愛さ	せる す しめる	愛させる (aisaseru, cause to love) 愛さす (aisasu) 愛さしめる (aisashimeru)
達す (tassu, reach)	達す	達さ	せる す しめる	達させる (tassaseru, cause to reach) 達さす (tassasu) 達さしめる (tassashimeru)
書く (kaku, write)	書く	書か	せる す しめる	書かせる (kakaseru, cause to write) 書かす (kakasu) 書かしめる (kakashimeru)
嗅ぐ (kagu, smell)	嗅ぐ	嗅が	せる す しめる	嗅がせる (kagaseru, cause to smell) 嗅がす (kagasu) 嗅がしめる (kagashimeru)
呼ぶ (yobu, call)	呼ぶ	呼ば	せる す しめる	呼ばせる (yobaseru, cause to call) 呼ばす (yobasu) 呼ばしめる (yobashimeru)
読む (yomu, read)	読む	読ま	せる す しめる	読ませる (yomaseru, cause to read) 読ます (yomasu) 読ましめる (yomashimeru)
死ぬ (shinu, die)	死ぬ	死な	せる す しめる	死なせる (shinaseru, cause to die) 死なす (shinasu) 死なしめる (shinashimeru)
Ichidan verbs
見る (miru, look)	見~~る~~	見	させる さす しめる	見させる (misaseru, cause to look) 見さす (misasu) 見しめる (mishimeru)
達しる (tasshiru, reach)	達し~~る~~	達し 達せ	させる さす しめる	達しさせる (tasshisaseru, cause to reach) 達せさせる (tassesaseru) 達しさす (tasshisasu) 達せさす (tassesasu) 達ししめる (tasshishimeru) 達せしめる (tasseshimeru)
察しる (sasshiru, guess)	察し~~る~~	察し 察せ	させる さす しめる	察しさせる (sasshisaseru, cause to guess) 察せさせる (sassesaseru) 察しさす (sasshisasu) 察せさす (sassesasu) 察ししめる (sasshishimeru) 察せしめる (sasseshimeru)
信じる (shinjiru, believe)	信じ~~る~~	信じ 信ぜ	させる さす しめる	信じさせる (shinjisaseru, cause to believe) 信ぜさせる (shinzesaseru) 信じさす (shinjisasu) 信ぜさす (shinzesasu) 信じしめる (shinjishimeru) 信ぜしめる (shinzeshimeru)
進じる (shinjiru, give)	進じ~~る~~	進じ 進ぜ	させる さす しめる	進じさせる (shinjisaseru, cause to give) 進ぜさせる (shinzesaseru) 進じさす (shinjisasu) 進ぜさす (shinzesasu) 進じしめる (shinjishimeru) 進ぜしめる (shinzeshimeru)
進ぜる (shinzeru, give)	進ぜ~~る~~	進ぜ	させる さす しめる	進ぜさせる (shinzesaseru, cause to give) 進ぜさす (shinzesasu) 進ぜしめる (shinzeshimeru)
出る (deru, exit)	出~~る~~	出	させる さす しめる	出させる (desaseru, cause to exit) 出さす (desasu) 出しめる (deshimeru)
Irregular verbs
する (suru, do)	す~~る~~	さ	せる す	させる (saseru, cause to do) さす (sasu)
する (suru, do)	す~~る~~	せ	させる さす しめる	せさせる (sesaseru, cause to do) せさす (sesasu) せしめる (seshimeru)
する (suru, do)	す~~る~~	し	させる さす	しさせる (shisaseru, cause to do) しさす (shisasu)
変化する (henka suru, transform)	変化す~~る~~	変化さ	せる す	変化させる (henka saseru, cause to transform) 変化さす (henka sasu)
変化する (henka suru, transform)	変化す~~る~~	変化せ	させる さす しめる	変化せさせる (henka sesaseru, cause to transform) 変化せさす (henka sesasu) 変化せしめる (henka seshimeru)
変化する (henka suru, transform)	変化す~~る~~	変化し	させる さす	変化しさせる (henka shisaseru, cause to transform) 変化しさす (henka shisasu)
愛する (aisuru, love)	愛す~~る~~	愛さ	せる す しめる	愛させる (aisaseru, cause to love) 愛さす (aisasu) 愛さしめる (aisashimeru)
愛する (aisuru, love)	愛す~~る~~	愛せ	させる さす しめる	愛せさせる (aisesaseru, cause to love) 愛せさす (aisesasu) 愛せしめる (aiseshimeru)
愛する (aisuru, love)	愛す~~る~~	愛し	させる さす	愛しさせる (aishisaseru, cause to love) 愛しさす (aishisasu)
達する (tassuru, reach)	達す~~る~~	達さ	せる す しめる	達させる (tassaseru, cause to reach) 達さす (tassasu) 達さしめる (tassashimeru)
達する (tassuru, reach)	達す~~る~~	達せ 達し	させる さす しめる	達せさせる (tassesaseru, cause to reach) 達しさせる (tasshisaseru) 達せさす (tassesasu) 達しさす (tasshisasu) 達せしめる (tasseshimeru) 達ししめる (tasshishimeru)
察する (sassuru, guess)	察す~~る~~	察せ 察し	させる さす しめる	察せさせる (sassesaseru, cause to guess) 察しさせる (sasshisaseru) 察せさす (sassesasu) 察しさす (sasshisasu) 察せしめる (sasseshimeru) 察ししめる (sasshishimeru)
信ずる (shinzuru, believe)	信ず~~る~~	信ぜ 信じ	させる さす しめる	信ぜさせる (shinzesaseru, cause to believe) 信じさせる (shinjisaseru) 信ぜさす (shinzesasu) 信じさす (shinjisasu) 信ぜしめる (shinzeshimeru) 信じしめる (shinjishimeru)
進ずる (shinzuru, give)	進ず~~る~~	進ぜ 進じ	させる さす しめる	進ぜさせる (shinzesaseru, cause to give) 進じさせる (shinjisaseru) 進ぜさす (shinzesasu) 進じさす (shinjisasu) 進ぜしめる (shinzeshimeru) 進じしめる (shinjishimeru)
来る (kuru, come)	く~~る~~	こ	させる さす しめる	来させる (kosaseru, cause to come) 来さす (kosasu) 来しめる (koshimeru)

=== Causative: Grammatical compatibility ===
A causative verb is either an ichidan or godan verb, and can be conjugated further in the same way those types of verbs can be.

It has been suggested that the double causative is possible, as in Ichirō ga Tarō ni Jirō ni to o akesasesaseta (一郎が太郎に次郎に戸を開けさせさせた; 'Ichirō caused Tarō to cause Jirō to open the door'), although it is doubtful whether speakers would find it comfortable.

The passive can be added on top of the causative to create the passivized causative:

- Ichidan causative: saseru (させる; 'she causes him to do it') → saserareru (させられる; 'he is caused to do it (by her)')
- Godan causative: sasu (さす; 'she causes him to do it') → sasareru (さされる; 'he is caused to do it (by her)')

The passivized causative results from the passive built on the causative, but not the opposite. It can also be used on auxiliaries that append to infinitives or gerunds, for example in saseraretsuzukesaserareru (させられ続けさせられる; 'he is caused to continue to be caused to do it'), saseraretagaraserareru (させられたがらせられる; 'he is caused to want to be caused to do it'), although such examples, while grammatically plausible, are probably not used.

Extended causative example sentences
English	Japanese	Function
I have been made to tend the little girls in the lower schoolroom, and to talk French to the Misses, until I grew sick of my mother‑tongue.	Atashi wa shita no kyōshitsu no chiisa na seitotachi no mendō o misaserare, mata ojōsantachi aite ni wa, ikura bokokugo da tte iya ni natte shimau hodo Furansu-go o shaberaserareta wa. (あたしは下の敎室の小さな生徒達の面倒を見させられ、又お孃さん達相手には、いくら母國語だつていやになつてしまふほどフランス語をしやべらせられたわ。)	passivity and passive potentiality
In reading this piece again, I was compelled to reflect on what it is like to be a married couple and a family.	Honpen o yonde aratamete, fūfu to wa, kazoku to wa, o watashi jishin ga kangaesaserareta. (本編を読んで改めて、夫婦とは、家族とは、を私自身が考えさせられた。)	passivity and passive potentiality
'[…] You don't seriously expect me to believe that a multimillionaire playboy like Raoul de Chevnair would ever notice a little nobody like you, let alone marry her!' (Note: You don't expect that I was made to believe.)	'[…] Masaka anna okuman chōja no pureibōi ga, anata no yō na na nashi no gaka ni chūmoku suru nante, honki de shinjisaserareru to omotcha inai wa yo ne. Mashite kekkon suru nado to wa!' (「[…] まさかあんな億万長者のプレイボーオイが、あなたのような名なしの画家に注目するなんて、本気で信じさせられると思っちゃいないわよね。まして結婚するなどとは！」)	passivity and passive potentiality
He imitated the action of a man's being impelled forward by the butt‑ends of muskets. (Note: A man's being impelled to walk.)	Kare wa shōjū no daijiri de hippatakarete muri ni arukaserareru otoko no dōsa o maneta. (彼は小銃の台尻でひっぱたかれて無理に歩かせられる男の動作をまねた。)	passivity and passive potentiality
The other day, some journalist came and said, "There'll be no mission as over the top as this one. There's just no way you could get a project like this off the ground these days." (Note: "It's utterly impossible to make a project like this run these days" or "A project like this will never be made to run these days.")	Senjitsu, aru jānarisuto no kata ga korarete, "Konna mucha kucha na misshon wa mō nai desu ne. Ima de wa tote mo konna keikaku wa hashiraserarenai desu ne". (先日，あるジャーナリストの方が来られて，「こんなムチャクチャなミッションはもうないですね。今ではとてもこんな計画は走らせられないですね」。)	passivity and passive potentiality
Make your beloved child travel. (Note: If you love your child, send them out on a journey to toughen them up.)	Kawaii/kawayuki/ito(o)shii/ito(o)shiki ko ni wa tabi o saseyo/sasero (可愛い・可愛き・愛(お)しい・愛(お)しき子には旅をさせよ・させろ)	imperativity
"They took the trouble to came here. Let them taste the food for poison first."	"Sekkaku aitsura ga tsuite kita n da. Mazu wa aitsura ni dokumi sasero yo" (「せっかくあいつらがついてきたんだ。まずはあいつらに毒見させろよ」)	imperativity
It keeps Cirello up at night . . . well, a lot of things keep him up at night . . . that Darnell would want him to reveal an undercover, name a snitch, and get someone killed.	Dāneru ga fukumen sōsakan ya tarekomiya no shōtai o akase to, sara ni dare ka o korosasero to sematte kuru koto o kangaeru to――riyū wa sore dake de wa nai ga――Shirero wa yoru mo nemurenai. (ダーネルが覆面捜査官やタレ込み屋の正体を明かせと、さらに誰かを殺させろと迫ってくることを考えると――理由はそれだけではないが――シレロは夜も眠れない。)	imperativity
To the privileged classes at home and to the despotic powers abroad, it was loudly proclaimed that the republic was of a peaceful nature, and "live and let live" was its motto.	Kokunai ni okeru tokken kaikyū to kokugai no senseiteki shokyōkoku ni taishite wa, kyōwa seiji wa heiwateki seishitsu no mono de aru koto, so shite ikiyo, shika shite ikishimeyo ga, sono hyōgo de aru koto ga koe takaku nobetsutaerareta. (國內における特權階級と國外の專制的諸强國にたいしては、共和政治は平和的性質のものであること、そして生きよ、しかして生きしめよが、その標語であることが聲たかくのべつたえられた。)	imperativity
"'Dum vivimus, vivamus!'—While we live, let us live! Yes, my love, yes!" (Note: Ikashimeyo is the imperative of the classical nidan ikashimu, which in turn is the causative of the classical yodan verb iku. It is equivalent to the modern pseudo-classical ichidan ikishimeyo.)	"Dumu vivimasu vivamasu! Sei aru kagiri, warera o ikashimeyo…… Sō yo, mai rabu, sō yo!" (「ドゥム ヴィヴィマス ヴィヴァマス！ 生ある限り、われらを生かしめよ……そうよ、あなた、そうよ！」)	imperativity

== See also ==
- Japanese negative form
- Japanese passive form
- Japanese potential form
- Japanese hortative form
