= Japanese passive form conjugation (mizenkei base) =

Japanese conjugation, like the conjugation of verbs of many other languages, allows verbs to be morphologically modified to change their meaning or grammatical function. In Japanese, the beginning of a word (the stem) is preserved during conjugation, while the ending of the word is altered in some way to change the meaning (this is the inflectional suffix). Japanese verb conjugations are independent of person, number and gender (they do not depend on whether the subject is I, you, he, she, we, etc.); the conjugated forms can express meanings such as negation, present and past tense, volition, passive voice, causation, imperative and conditional mood, and ability. There are also special forms for conjunction with other verbs, and for combination with particles for additional meanings.

Japanese verbs have agglutinating properties: some of the conjugated forms are themselves conjugable verbs (or i-adjectives), which can result in several suffixes being strung together in a single verb form to express a combination of meanings.

A revision sheet visually summarizing the conjugations and uses described below

Conjugable words (verbs, i‑adjectives, and na‑adjectives) are traditionally considered to have six possible conjugational stems or bases (活用形, katsuyōkei; literally "conjugation forms"). This article lists those from the negative base (未然形, mizenkei), as well as the tentative base (推量形/意思形, suiryōkei/ishikei) that was split off during the post‑WWII spelling reforms.

The passive or passive potential turns the patient (or target) or victim of an action into a subject, which can be marked with the nominative particle ga.

The pure passive simply expresses what act is done by the agent (A) to the patient (P), thus A ga P o yobu (AがPを呼ぶ; 'A calls P') becomes P ga A ni yobareru (PがAに呼ばれる; 'P is called by A'). The agent is typically marked with ni, but kara can sometimes be used instead, especially if ni might be ambiguous; for example in P ga A ni B ni shōkai sareru (PがAにBに紹介される), it is not clear which between A and B the agent is, so kara can be used instead as in P ga A kara B ni shōkai sareru (PがAからBに紹介される; 'P is introduced by A to B').

The adversative, "victimizing" or affective passive expresses how a victim (V) is affected by, or suffers from, if the original verb is intransitive, the act being done by an agent, as in V ga A ni shinareru (VがAに死なれる; 'V suffers because A dies'); or, if the original verb is transitive, the act being done by an agent to a patient, as in V ga A ni P o yobareru (VがAにPを呼ばれる; 'V suffers because A calls P'). The terms adversative and victimizing are broadly correct, although the "victim" can sometimes be positively or even desirably affected by the action, so affective would be a more general term; for example, Atsui kara soto ni dete kaze ni fukarete kimasu (暑いから外に出て風に吹かれてきます; transl. It's hot so I'll go outside and get some wind, lit. 'It's hot, so I'll go outside and get affected by the wind blowing'), Sensei ni kodomo o homerareta (先生に子供を褒められた; transl. My kid was praised by her teacher, lit. 'I was affected by the fact that the teacher praised my kid'), etc. Sometimes what seems to be positive may turn out to be negative with additional context, such as Itsu datta ka, watashi wa densha no naka de seinen kara seki o yuzurareta koto ga atta […] Watashi wa sono toki, isasaka yūutsu de atta (いつだったか、私は電車の中で青年から席を譲られたことがあった[…]私はその時、いささか憂鬱であった; transl. Once on a train I was given a seat by a young man […] I was a bit depressed that time [because I would rather him ignore my disability and treat me like a normal person]). English has some similar constructions with intransitive verbs, though not necessarily with a negative connotation, such as "I got rained on" or "I got talked to".

The passive can also have no passive meaning, but is merely a more honorific way to exalt the subject. Some verbs that come with the particle ni may be ambiguous when used this way, as it might not be clear whether it is in the passive or the honorific without context. For example, since the verb katsu (勝つ; 'win') comes with ni whether or not it is in the passive, (Note: A ga teki ni katsu (Aが敵に勝つ; 'A wins against an opponent'), A ga onore ni katsu (Aが己に勝つ; 'A wins against themself'), A ga byōki ni katsu (Aが病気に勝つ; 'A wins against sickness'), A ga yūwaku ni katsu (Aが誘惑に勝つ; 'A wins against temptation'), A ga tatakai ni katsu (Aが戦いに勝つ; 'A wins a battle'), A ga soshō ni katsu (Aが訴訟に勝つ; 'A wins a lawsuit'), A ga senkyo ni katsu (Aが選挙に勝つ; 'A wins an election'), A ga kyōgi ni katsu (Aが競技に勝つ; 'A wins a contest'), etc.) in the line "Anata ga hime ni kataretara chin mo kōfuku de gozaimasu zo" (「王子殿が姬に勝たれたら朕も幸福で御座いますぞ」), out of context, the king could be glad either if the prince is defeated by his princess (affective passive), or if he defeats her (subject exaltation); in context, it is the subject‑exalting interpretation, hence "We would be delighted if ye defeat our princess."

Actual sentences may lack one of the said components (P, V or A) and therefore can become ambiguous (purely passive, adversatively passive or honorific) without additional context, for example kekkonshiki ni yobareru (結婚式に呼ばれる; 'one gets invited to weddings; one suffers because someone else's invited to weddings; those honoroble invite others to weddings'). Intransitive verbs, such as korareru (来られる) and arareru (あられる), do not have the pure passive meaning, only the other two, as in V ga A ni korareru (VがAに来られる; 'V suffers because A comes') and S ga C de arareru (SがCであられる; 'S is (honorably) C').

Historically, the "passive" construction has also had potential use, but except for ichidan verbs and kuru, this use now has a dialectal or old‑fashioned literary flavor. It has been argued that the various meanings of the passive arose from the spontaneous potential (see #Potential for more), which spawned both the regular potential and the regular passive, the latter of which came to be used additionally for subject exaltation. It has also been suggested that the pure passive came to be in its current state due to translations from the English passive.

== Passive form example sentences ==
Passive form example sentences
English	Japanese	Function
Tarō was beaten by his father.	Tarō wa chichioya ni nagurareta. (太郎は父親に殴られた。)	pure passivity (中立受身, chūritsu ukemi; the subject is the patient)
Today's America was made by immigrants.	Genzai no Amerika wa imintachi ni yotte tsukurareta (現在のアメリカは移民たちによって作られた)	pure passivity (中立受身, chūritsu ukemi; the subject is the patient)
In other words, Japanese perceptual psychologists have begun to write many papers in English, and they have been read by researchers all over the world.	Tsumari, Nihon no chikaku shinrigakusha ga eigo de ronbun o ōku kaku yō ni nari, sono ronbun ga sekaijū no kenkyūsha ni yomareru yō ni natta to yū koto de aru. (つまり，日本の知覚心理学者が英語で論文を多く書くようになり，その論文が世界中の研究者に読まれるようになったということである。)	pure passivity (中立受身, chūritsu ukemi; the subject is the patient)
Tarō's father died. (Note: Tarō lived through his father's death.)	Tarō wa chichioya ni shinareta. (太郎は父親に死なれた。)	adversative/affective passivity (被害・迷惑受身, higai/meiwaku ukemi; the subject is affected, often negatively, by the agent's action)
My mother read my diary. (Note: I was subject to the fact that my mother read my diary.)	Nikki o hahaoya ni yomareta (日記を母親に読まれた)	adversative/affective passivity (被害・迷惑受身, higai/meiwaku ukemi; the subject is affected, often negatively, by the agent's action)
The inspector dropped in on us without notice. (Note: We were in trouble because the inspector dropped by without notice.)	Nan no sata mo naku shigakukan ni korareta (何の沙汰も無く視学官に来られた)	adversative/affective passivity (被害・迷惑受身, higai/meiwaku ukemi; the subject is affected, often negatively, by the agent's action)
Lilischur felt the chill as if she had been rained on, while Manfred felt like he was shaken in both mind and body. (Note: She suffered as though she got caught in the rain, and he suffered as though his mind and body were shaken.)	Ririshua wa ame ni furareta yō na usurasamui kibun datta ga, Manfurēto wa kokoro mo karada mo yusaburareta yō de. (リリーシュアは雨に降られたような薄ら寒い気分だったが、マンフレートは心も身体も揺さぶられたようで。)	adversative/affective passivity (被害・迷惑受身, higai/meiwaku ukemi; the subject is affected, often negatively, by the agent's action)
[…] and each, in this contest, wishes to be conquered rather than conquer. (Note: Kataretagaru (勝たれたがる) is here translated as "wishes to be conquered," but the original verb katsu (勝つ; 'win') is intransitive, so the pure passive does not apply. The context is clear that this passive is not "adversative," but desired.)	[…] sō shite sōhō to mo sono kyōgi de wa, katsu yori mo, kataretagaru no de aru. ([…]さうして雙方ともその競技では、勝つよりも、勝たれたがるのである。)	adversative/affective passivity (被害・迷惑受身, higai/meiwaku ukemi; the subject is affected, often negatively, by the agent's action)
It was Mr Brown who came to see you.	Anata ni ai ni korareta no wa Buraun-san deshita (あなたに会いに来られたのはブラウンさんでした)	subject exaltation (尊敬, sonkei; the subject is the exalted agent)
What school did you go to?	Gakkō wa dochira e ikaremashita ka (学校はどちらへ行かれましたか)	subject exaltation (尊敬, sonkei; the subject is the exalted agent)
When holy Harry died, and my sweet son.	Atta, ano shinsei na Henrī-dono ga shinareta toki ni, ore no taisetsu no ko no, ano kawaii Edowādo ga shinda toki ni! (あった、あの神聖なヘンリーどのが死なれた時に、おれの大切の子の、あの可愛いエドワードが死んだ時に！)	subject exaltation (尊敬, sonkei; the subject is the exalted agent)
No, this man could not toil, he could never exert himself, I thought with resignation.	Iya, kono otoko ni wa tsutomerarenai, funpatsu serarenai, to akiramemashita. (いや、此男には勉められない、奮發せられない、と斷念しました。)	potentiality (可能, kanō)
This place called Sumita was a hot‑spring town, about ten minutes by train away from the castle town, or you could walk for thirty minutes,	Kono Sumita to yū tokoro wa onsen no aru machi de, jōka kara kisha da to jippun bakari, aruite sanjippun de yukareru, (此住田と云ふ所は溫泉のある町で、城下から汽車だと十分許り、步行いて三十分で行かれる、)	potentiality (可能, kanō)
"[…] There the Blessed One may both drink water and cool his limbs."	――"[…] Soko de Seson wa mizu mo nomaremashō shi teashi mo hiyasaremashō." (――「[…]其處で世尊は水も飮まれませうし手足も冷されませう。」)	potentiality (可能, kanō)
for the unhappiest man was he who could not die, and happy he who could.	Naze ka to ieba, shinenai mono wa saidai fukōmono de, shinareru mono wa kōfukumono de aru kara da. (なぜかと言へば、死ねない者は最大不幸者で、死なれる者は幸福者であるからだ。)	potentiality (可能, kanō)
However, as the old saying goes, "You can't win against a crybaby or an estate steward," even if the government does such a thing in Japan, those calling themselves civil servants cannot do anything about it. (Note: The saying is now more commonly known, with the short potential, as Naku ko to jitō ni wa katenu (泣く子と地頭には勝てぬ). It means that it is impossible to reason with people who will not listen, whether that be a tantrum-throwing child or a tyrannical authority.)	Shika shi, naku ko to jitō ni wa katarenu to mukashi kara yūte oru tōri, Nihon de wa, seifu ga sō yū koto o shite mo, kanri taru mono wa nani to mo shikata ga nai. (併し、泣く子と地頭には勝たれぬと昔から云ふて居る通り、日本では、政府がさう云ふことをしても、官吏たるものは何とも仕方がない。)	potentiality (可能, kanō)
Next to this woman whom I had left barely a moment ago, the rest of humanity looked very far‑off. […] The doorknob of my room differed from all other doorknobs in the world in that, without my needing to turn it, the door opens all by itself. Manually turning it was so unconscious that it seemed that way. […] My grandmother thought it was very important to not look like we served it only when there were guests, as she held that that was a kind thing to do. (Note: Omowareru (思われる) is the passive potential of omou (思う; 'think'). Its short potential counterpart is omoeru (思える). Apart from passive and honorific meanings, it often has a "spontaneous potential" meaning (see #Potential for more), which means that rather than "I can think," it suggests "it occurs to me without my intention." The spontaneous potential meaning of omowareru is common enough to merit separate entries in bilingual dictionaries, which translate it as "it seems/appears," along with omoeru.)	Tsui imashigata wakareta bakari no sono onna ni kurabereba, hoka no ningen nado haruka ni tōi sonzai no yō ni omowareta. […] Watashi no heya no ano doanobu wa sekaijū no donna doanobu to mo chigatte, wazawaza mawasanakute mo doa ga hitori de ni aku. Sō omowareru hodo, nobu o te de mawasu dōsa ga muishiki no uchi ni nasarete ita. […] Sobo wa raikyaku no toki dake tokubetsu ni shiroppu o dasu to omowarenai yō ni suru koto ga sukoburu daiji da to omotte ita shi, sono hō ga shinsetsu da to kangaete ita. (ついいましがた別れたばかりのその女に比べれば、ほかの人間などはるかに遠い存在のように思われた。[…]私の部屋のあのドアノブは世界中のどんなドアノブとも違って、わざわざ回さなくてもドアがひとりでに開く。そう思われるほど、ノブを手で回す動作が無意識のうちになされていた。[…]祖母は来客のときだけ特別にシロップを出すと思われないようにすることがすこぶる大事だと思っていたし、そのほうが親切だと考えていた。)	potentiality (可能, kanō)

== Passive: Conjugation table ==
The passive form is created by using the mizenkei base, followed by the reru/rareru (れる・られる) suffix. For ichidan verbs and kuru (来る), the passive form and the potential form have an identical conjugation pattern with the same rareru (られる) suffix. This makes it impossible to distinguish whether an ichidan verb adopts a passive or potential function without contextual information.

Arareru is historically attested with potential uses, but it is now primarily the more honorific way of saying aru (ある) and iru (いる).

Honorific verbs can be made even more polite, as in irassharareru (いらっしゃられる), ossharareru (仰られる), etc. Excessively honorific verbs have been proscribed by textbooks, but they seem somewhat tolerable by speakers, even though they are still not as frequent with options without ‑reru. There are historical precedents of such double honorifics dating back to the Edo period.

Sareru is said to be shortened from serareru, the latter of which is said to be "pseudo‑literary" (meant to emulate the writing style of classical Japanese). Shirareru is rare for Group‑A verbs, and is not to be confused with the segmentally and accentually homophonous shirareru (知られる; 'be known'), which may also be spelt in hiragana. The three forms sareru, serareru and shirareru can sometimes be used interchangeably within the same text: Sono hito igai no mono kara mo, mata sono hito ga watashi o sore hodo kōfuku ni shita to wa chigatta hōhō de, watashi ga aishirareru to omou koto wa hanahada fuyukai de aru. […] Watashi wa jibun no chikara ni oyobu mono nara, arayuru hito ni aisaretai. Watashi wa tan ni ikko no ningen to shite, hoka no hito kara aisareuru kagiri kōdo no ai o, jibun no tsuma kara uketai. […] Gōman na kokoro wa sonna fū ni aisareru koto ni, isshu no yūwaku o kanzuru. […] So shite watashi to dōiken de nai kano wakaki onna ni aiseraretaku nai no da. (その人以外の者からも、又その人が私をそれほど幸福にしたとは違つた方法で、私が愛しられると思ふことは甚だ不愉快である。[…]私は自分の力に及ぶものなら、あらゆる人に愛されたい。私は單に一個の人間として、他の人から愛され得る限り高度の愛を、自分の妻から受けたい。[…]傲慢な心はそんな風に愛されることに、一種の誘惑を感ずる。[…]そして私と同意見でない彼の若き女に愛せられたくないのだ。; 'It is very unpleasant to think that I were loved by anyone other than that person, in a way other than how she has made me so happy. […] I want to be loved by everyone within my power. I want to receive from my wife as much love as possibly earned by one human being from another, […] A proud heart feels a kind of temptation to be loved in such a way, […] and I do not want to be loved by that young girl who does not share my view.').

Dictionary form	Pattern			Passive form
Godan and pseudo‑yodan verbs
結う (yuu/yū, fasten)	結う	結わ	れる	結われる (yuwareru, (can) be fastened / suffer because one fastens / (can) fasten / be fastenable)
言(い)う (yū, say)	ゆう	いわ ゆわ	れる	言われる (iwareru/yuwareru, (can) be said / suffer because one says / (can) say / be sayable)
勝つ (katsu, win)	勝つ	勝た	れる	勝たれる (katareru, suffer because one wins / (can) win)
狩る (karu, hunt)	狩る	狩ら	れる	狩られる (karareru, (can) be hunted / suffer because one hunts / (can) hunt / be huntable)
有る (aru, exist)	有る	有ら	れる	有られる (arareru, suffer because one exists / (can) exist)
為さる (nasaru, do)	為さる	為さら	れる	為さられる (nasarareru, (can) be done / suffer because one does / (can) do / be doable/feasible)
貸す (kasu, lend)	貸す	貸さ	れる	貸される (kasareru, (can) be lent / suffer because one lends / (can) lend / be lendable)
愛す (aisu, love)	愛す	愛さ	れる	愛される (aisareru, (can) be loved / suffer because one loves / (can) love / be lovable)
達す (tassu, reach)	達す	達さ	れる	達される (tassareru, (can) be reached / suffer because one reaches / (can) reach / be reachable)
書く (kaku, write)	書く	書か	れる	書かれる (kakareru, (can) be written / suffer because one writes / (can) write / be writable)
嗅ぐ (kagu, smell)	嗅ぐ	嗅が	れる	嗅がれる (kagareru, (can) be smelled / suffer because one smells / (can) smell / be smellable)
呼ぶ (yobu, call)	呼ぶ	呼ば	れる	呼ばれる (yobareru, (can) be called / suffer because one calls / (can) call / be callable)
読む (yomu, read)	読む	読ま	れる	読まれる (yomareru, (can) be read / suffer because one reads / (can) read / be readable/legible)
死ぬ (shinu, die)	死ぬ	死な	れる	死なれる (shinareru, suffer because one dies / (can) die)
Ichidan verbs
見る (miru, look)	見~~る~~	見	られる	見られる (mirareru, (can) be seen / suffer because one looks / (can) look / be seeable/viewable/watchable/visible)
達しる (tasshiru, reach)	達し~~る~~	達し 達せ	られる	達しられる (tasshirareru, (can) be reached / suffer because one reaches / (can) reach / be reachable) 達せられる (tasserareru)
察しる (sasshiru, guess)	察し~~る~~	察し 察せ	られる	察しられる (sasshirareru, (can) be guessed / suffer because one guesses / (can) guess / be guessable) 察せられる (sasserareru)
信じる (shinjiru, (can) believe)	信じ~~る~~	信じ 信ぜ	られる	信じられる (shinjirareru, (can) be believed / suffer because one believes / (can) believe / be believable/trustable) 信ぜられる (shinzerareru)
進ぜる (shinzeru, give)	進ぜ~~る~~	進ぜ	られる	進ぜられる (shinzerareru, (can) be given / suffer because one gives / (can) give / be givable)
出る (deru, exit)	出~~る~~	出	られる	出られる (derareru, suffer because one exits / (can) exit)
Irregular verbs
する (suru, do)	す~~る~~	さ	れる	される (sareru, (can) be done / suffer because one does / (can) do / be doable/feasible)
する (suru, do)	す~~る~~	せ し	られる	せられる (serareru, (can) be done / suffer because one does / (can) do / be doable/feasible) しられる (shirareru)
勉強する (benkyō suru, study)	勉強す~~る~~	勉強さ	れる	勉強される (benkyō sareru, (can) be studied / suffer because one studies / (can) study / be studiable)
勉強する (benkyō suru, study)	勉強す~~る~~	勉強せ 勉強し	られる	勉強せられる (benkyō serareru, (can) be studied / suffer because one studies / (can) study / be studiable) 勉強しられる (benkyō shirareru)
愛する (aisuru, love)	愛す~~る~~	愛さ	れる	愛される (aisareru, (can) be loved / suffer because one loves / (can) love / be lovable)
愛する (aisuru, love)	愛す~~る~~	愛せ 愛し	られる	愛せられる (aiserareru, (can) be loved / suffer because one loves / (can) love / be lovable) 愛しられる (aishirareru)
達する (tassuru, reach)	達す~~る~~	達さ	れる	達される (tassareru, (can) be reached / suffer because one reaches / (can) reach / be reachable)
達する (tassuru, reach)	達す~~る~~	達せ 達し	られる	達せられる (tasserareru, (can) be reached / suffer because one reaches / (can) reach / be reachable) 達しられる (tasshirareru)
察する (sassuru, guess)	察す~~る~~	察せ 察し	られる	察せられる (sasserareru, (can) be guessed / suffer because one guesses / (can) guess / be guessable) 察しられる (sasshirareru)
信ずる (shinzuru, (can) believe)	信ず~~る~~	信ぜ 信じ	られる	信ぜられる (shinzerareru, (can) be believed / suffer because one believes / (can) believe / be believable/trustable) 信じられる (shinjirareru)
進ずる (shinzuru, give)	進ず~~る~~	進ぜ 進じ	られる	進ぜられる (shinzerareru, (can) be given / suffer because one gives / (can) give / be givable) 進じられる (shinjirareru)
来る (kuru, come)	く~~る~~	こ	られる	来られる (korareru, suffer because one comes / (can) come)

== Passive: Grammatical compatibility ==
A passive potential verb is an ichidan verb, and can be conjugated further mostly in the same way an ichidan verb can be, although its imperative is uncommon.

Extended passive potential example sentences
English	Japanese	Function
"Be a good piggy and let me eat you!" (Note: Get eaten by me quietly, Pork!)	"Otonashiku ore ni kuwarero, butaniku!" (「おとなしく俺に食われろ、豚肉！」)	passive imperativity
Thou sun that comfort'st, burn!—Speak and be hang'd!	Taiyō yo, ian wa ataeru na, yakikoroshite yare! Kuchi o kiku yatsu 'a shimekorosarero! (太陽よ、慰安は與へるな、燒き殺してやれ！ 口をきくやつァ縊殺されろ！)	passive imperativity
"……Go to the Archbishop? You're telling me to stab the Archbishop to death?" "You get stabbed to death!"	"……Daishukyō no tokoro ni itte? Atashi ni Daishukyō o sashikorose tte yū no?" "Omae ga sashikorosarero" (「……大主教のところに行って？ あたしに大主教を刺し殺せっていうの？」 「おまえが刺し殺されろ」)	passive imperativity
"It would take too long to get Bodie up there. I'd be arrested." "You should be!" (Note: Get arrested!)	"Jakuson Hōru made iku ni wa jikan ga kakaru. Bōdi ga kaketsukeru mae ni boku ga taiho sarete shimau" "Taiho sarero!" (「ジャクソン・ホールまで行くには時間がかかる。ボーディが駆けつける前に僕が逮捕されてしまう」 「逮捕されろ！」)	passive imperativity
However, the adage popular in the aviation industry before COVID, "get better, get bigger or get bought out," should still ring true even today among small and medium business owners in the industry.	Shika shi, Korona-ka mae kara no kōkūki sangyō de ryūkō no kakugen, sunawachi "Get better, Get bigger or Get bought out" (kaizen seyo, kibo kakudai seyo, samo nakereba baishū sareyo) to yū kotoba wa, konnichi sara ni genjitsusei o motte, kōkūki sangyō no chūshōkigyō keieisha no mimi ni hibiite iru hazu de aru. (しかし、コロナ禍前からの航空機産業で流行の格言、すなわち「Get better, Get bigger or Get bought out」（改善せよ、規模拡大せよ、さもなければ買収されよ）という言葉は、今日さらに現実性を持って、航空機産業の中小企業経営者の耳に響いているはずである。)	passive imperativity
He would have offered his own head to Nobunaga in Master Nobuyasu's stead, but Ieyasu, deeply appreciative of such sentiment, declined. (Note: He meant to be affected by the proposal that someone would offer his head.)	Onore no kubi o Nobuyasu-sama no kubi to shite Nobunaga ni sashidasareyo, to yū mono de atta ga, Ieyasu wa sono kokorone itaku kansha shitsutsu kyozetsu shita. (己の首を信康様の首として信長に差し出されよ、というものであったが、家康はその心根に痛く感謝しつつ拒絶した。)	passive imperativity
If you can't beat them, join them. (Note: Get rolled by the long thing.)	Nagai mono ni wa makarero/makareyo (長い物には巻かれろ・巻かれよ)	passive imperativity
"Come on now, Lord Ura, pray rise in haste. […]"	"Sā sā, Ura-dono mo hayaku okirareyo. […]" (「さあさあ、ウラ殿も早く起きられよ。[…]」)	subject‑exalting imperativity
Should you wish to make the Iliad, put yourself on diet.	Shokun ga Iriaddo o tsukuran to hosseba, mazu danjiki o serareyo. (諸君がイリアツドを作らんと欲せば、先づ斷食をせられよ。)	subject‑exalting imperativity
And the striking thing was that the aforementioned phrase also meant "Come in to my bar."	So shite toku ni omoshiroi koto ni wa, migi no monku wa mata "Waga sakaba ni korareyo" to yū imi o fukunde ita no de aru. (そして特に面白いことには、右の文句はまた「吾が酒場に來られよ」といふ意味を含んでゐたのである。)	subject‑exalting imperativity
Hie you to horse: adieu, Till you return at night. Goes Fleance with you?	Sonna uma de hayaku itte korarei. Saraba ja. Ban ni mata ome ni kakarō. Furiansu-dono mo tsurete yukareru ka. (そんな馬で早く往つて來られい。さらばぢや。 晩に又お目に掛からう。フリアンス殿も連れて往かれるか。)	subject‑exalting imperativity
Lo, in this right hand, whose protection Is most divinely vow'd upon the right Of him it holds, stands young Plantagenet,	Mirarei, kono migi no te ni […] tatte orareru no ga Purantajenetto seikei no shōkōshi de, (見られい、此右の手に[…]立ってをられるのがプランタヂェネット正系の少公子で、)	subject‑exalting imperativity
As you shall prove us, praise us.	Teshō o mita ue de hyō o serarei. (手證を見た上で評をせられい。)	subject‑exalting imperativity

== See also ==
- Japanese negative form
- Japanese potential form
- Japanese causative form
- Japanese hortative form
