= Cherokee grammar =

Grammar of the Cherokee language

Cherokee or Tsalagi (ᏣᎳᎩ ᎦᏬᏂᎯᏍᏗ, Tsalagi Gawonihisdi [dʒalaˈɡî ɡawónihisˈdî]) is an endangered-to-moribund Iroquoian language and the native language of the Cherokee people.

All presented prefixes and suffixes will be in the Latin script.

== General ==
Cherokee is a polysynthetic verb-heavy nominative–accusative language with a non-productive incorporation system. Verbs may be inflected with a large number of suffixes and prefixes that express a range of properties, including subject and/or object agreement, tense and aspect, and evidentiality.

== Verbs ==
Verbs are the central, obligatory part of Cherokee sentences (with the exception of affirmative copular sentences in the present tense). Verbs in Cherokee fall into two conjugation classes, which determine the forms of pronominal prefixes in most tenses.

=== Structure ===
The morphological structure of verbs can be analyzed in terms of a slot system, in which every verb possesses the following basic slots. Obligatory items are marked in bold.

prefixes	verb stem	suffixes
initial / **pronouns** / reflexive; -3 / -2 / -1	verb stem	non-final / **final**; 1 / 2

Please note that for every following table only the basic form, sometimes/mostly even without a translation, will be listed to not overload the visual input. Phonemical changes and the meaning depend heavily on context and are better described individually in the following sections. The basic morpheme will be displayed in bold for disambiguation. Here is an overview for the depiction of the context and the following changes:

Symbol	Meaning
_C	before a consonant
_V	before a vowel
C_	after a consonant
V_	etc.
=	_ becomes _
X	zero-marking
_x	deletes the following phoneme (often because of merging)
+	in cooperation with

==== Initial prefixes (-3) ====
The initial prefixes are optional. They may not co-occur if they inhabit the same slot or convey contradictory ideas.

-7	-6	-5	-4	-3	-2	-1
y	w	n	de	da	i	ga
j				di		e

slot	prefix	_C	_V	_w	_h	_i	-**i**	**y/n/w_**	**y/n/w_**h	_a	_**da/di**	_**ga**	_**u**	X_	**meaning**	+	**marks**
-7	y	yi	y	yu	hy_x										-uncertainty -if-clause -negation	X (subordinate clause) hla+	
-7	j	ji	j	ju											-relative clauses -specific past -negative imperative -repetitive imperative	X (time-word) hlesdi+ X	can also not occur with **ga-**
-6	w	wi	w		hw_x										-face/motion/distance away from speaker -"let" (non 2 person) -dative	X X **-el**	
-5	n	ni	n		hn_x										-lateral position -"already" -negative (relative clause) -"without"	X (past tense/fut.progr./habitual) -**na** +**j**(to be) X	
-4	de	de	d			de_x	do_x	di	t_x		do				-plural inanimate_objects/acts	X	
-4	de	de	j			de_x	do_x	di	t_x	di_x	do			**e-**	-plural inanimate_objects/acts	(imperative/infinitive)	
-3	da	da	day		t_x	da_x	dv_x								future	-**i** (future tense)	
-3	da	di	j		t_x										future	-**esdi** (habitual)	
-3	da	da	day		t_x					dv_x					motion towards speaker		
-3	da	di	j		t_x					di_X					motion towards speaker	(habitual/progressive/reportative)	
-3	di	di	j			di_x				di_X					motion towards speaker		
-2	i	i	X3									v			-"again"		can be substituted by high pitch
-2	i	v	X3												-"again"	-**vi**	can be substituted by high pitch
-1	ga	ga	gay							gv_x					-"since"		
-1	ga	ge													-"since"	(2nd person)	
-1	ga		gvw										gvwa_x		-"since"	(3rd person)	

==== Pronoun prefixes (-2) ====
All Cherokee verbs occur with a pronoun prefix that expresses person properties of a subject argument, object argument, or some combinations of subject and object properties. There are two sets of pronoun prefixes, set A and set B (also known as set I and set II). Only set B prefixes are used with completive and infinitive stems. In other tenses, the choice of prefix is determined by the identity of the verb. These are only present if the verb is intransitive, for transitive verbs one joined set is used. Mark that the exclusive forms are generated by taking the corresponding 2nd person form and adding an "O".

===== Set I (A) =====
(The structure is _C | _V)

Person	Singular	Dual		Plural	
Person	Singular	inclusive	exclusive	inclusive	exclusive
1	ji | g	ini | in	**o**sdi | **o**sd	idi | id	**o**ji | **o**j
2	hi | h	sdi | sd		iji | ij	
3	ga/a | X	ani | an			

===== Set II (B) =====
Person	Singular	Dual		Plural	
Person	Singular	inclusive	exclusive	inclusive	exclusive
1	agi | agw	gini | gin	**o**gini | **o**gin	igi | ig	**o**gi | **o**g
2	ja | j	desdi | desd		deji | dej	
3	u | X	uni | un			

===== Compound pronouns =====
Compound pronoun prefixes express a combination of subject and object properties. Some unique forms are used when both the subject and object of the verb are participants in the conversation (first and second person). Other compound pronouns are used with combinations of a first or second person subject and a third person object. These forms depend on the animacy of the third person object. A prominent feature of transitive pronouns is the -y- insertion. Often the pronoun relationship is both ways and can be used for either action, ambiguity is ensured by patterns of changes within the verb stem.

====== 1st person singular object - 'me' ======
Person	Singular	Dual	Plural
2	sgi | sgw	sgini | sgin	isgi | isgiy
3	agwa | agw	gvgi | gvgw	

====== 2nd person singular object 'thee' ======
Person	Singular	Dual	Plural
Person	Singular	exclusive!	exclusive!
1	gv | gvy	sdv | sdvy	ijv | ijvy
3	ja | j	geji | gej	

Easily recognizable are the forms of the first-to-second person plural and dual. They are produced via a vowel alternation from the second person forms in which former -i- now wields -v-.

====== 3rd person singular animate object 'the other' ======
Person	Singular	Dual		Plural	
Person	Singular	inclusive	exclusive	inclusive	exclusive
1	ji | jiy	eni | en	osdi | osd	edi | ed	oji | oj
2	hi | hiy	esdi | esd		eji | ej	
3	ga/a | g	A: ani | an B: uni | un			

These are basically the set A pronouns, but with a -y- insertion in the singular and an -e- prefix in all forms where the second person is active and non-singular.

====== 3rd person singular inanimate object 'it' set A ======
Person	Singular	Dual		Plural	
Person	Singular	inclusive	exclusive	inclusive	exclusive
1	ji | g	ini | in	osdi | osd	idi | id	oji | oj
2	hi | h	sdi | sd		iji | ij	
3	ga/a | g	ani | an			

====== 3rd person singular inanimate object 'it' set B ======
Person	Singular	Dual		Plural	
Person	Singular	inclusive	exclusive	inclusive	exclusive
1	agi | agw	gini | gin	ogini | ogin	igi | ig	ogi | og
2	ja | j	sdi | sd		iji | ij	
3	u | uw	uni | un			

====== 1st person dual inclusive object "us both" ======
Person	Singular	Plural
3	gini | gin	gegini | gegin

These basically stem from the active forms of the corresponding set B pronouns, but now they represent the direct object instead.

====== 1st person dual exclusive object "me and him/her" ======
Person	Singular	Dual	Plural
2	sgini | sgin		isgi | isgiy
3	ogini | ogin	gogini | gogin	

====== 2nd person dual object "you two" ======
Person	Singular	Dual	Plural
Person	Singular	exclusive!	exclusive!
1	sdv | sdvy		ijv | ijvy
3	sdi | sd	gesdi | gesd	

====== 1st person plural inclusive object "us (all)" ======
Person	Singular	Plural
3	igi | ig	gegi | geg

====== 1st person plural exclusive object "me and them" ======
Person	Singular	Dual	Plural
2	isgi | isgiy		
3	ogi | og	gogi | gog	

====== 2nd person plural object "you (all)" ======
Person	Singular	Dual	Plural
Person	Singular	exclusive!	exclusive!
1	ijv | ijvy	iji | ij	
3	iji | ij	geji | gej	

====== 3rd person plural animate object "them" ======
Person	Singular	Dual		Plural	
Person	Singular	inclusive	exclusive	inclusive	exclusive
1	gaji | gajiy	geni | gen	gosdi | gosd	gedi | ged	goji | goj
2	gahi | gahiy	gesdi | gesd		geji | gej	
3	degi | deg	A: gani | gan B: guni | gun			

====== 3rd person plural inanimate object "these things" set A ======
Person	Singular	Dual		Plural	
Person	Singular	inclusive	exclusive	inclusive	exclusive
1	dega | deg	deni | den	dosdi | dosd	dedi | ded	doji | doj
2	dehi | deh	desdi | desd		deji | dej	
3	degi | deg	dani | dan			

====== 3rd person plural inanimate object "these things" set B ======
Person	Singular	Dual		Plural	
Person	Singular	inclusive	exclusive	inclusive	exclusive
1	dagi | dagw	degini | degin	dogini | dogin	degi | deg	dogi | dog
2	deja | dej	desdi | desd		deji | dej	
3	du | duw	duni | dun			

==== Reflexive marker (-1) ====
	_C	_V	_a	u_	number	meaning	+
**ada**	ada	adad	ad	**uda**	sg (dl/pl)	reflexive action "oneself"	
**ada**	ada	adad	ad	**uda**	dl or pl	reciprocative: "each other"	de-

==== Final and non-final suffixes (1) ====
The slots of both final and non-final suffixes cannot be properly dissected and thus the attribute final only means that one of these is obligated at all times. For some suffixes even the exact position is disputed amongst native speakers. In the following table final suffixes are marked bold. Because of the sheer amount of suffixes and the number of exceptions it is more efficient for students to learn the most common fused forms first (mostly those with -'i). Markers of aspect and tense are found in this category.

1	2	3	4	5	6	7	8	9	10	11	12	13
gi	is	ilo	dan	ohn	el	idol	e	g	v'i	gwu	**sgo**	ju
e			dohdan				ihl	**idi**	e'i			ke
y								**i**	esdi			na
									o'i			hv
									di			isi
									a			dina
												dv

slot	suffix	_C	_V	_g	s_									meaning	+
slot	suffix					_(any suffix)	**_ga**	**_v'i**	**_di**	**_ilo**	**_el**	**_a**	**_i**	meaning	+
1	gi	gi	gis											reversive	
1	e													reversive	(last stem vowel x)
1	y													reversive	(before last stem vowel)
2	is	is	isis				isiha_xx	isahn	isoh					duplicative	
2	is	is	isahn	isis			isiha_xx			is	isan			"become"	
3	ilo	ilos	ilo'									iloj		repetitive	
4	dan		dan	dis			diha_xx		doh			d		causative/instrumentative	
4	dohdan		dohdan	dohdis			dohdiha_xx		dohdoh			dohd		unintentional	
5	ohn		ohn	ohvs					ohvs					completive	
6	el		el				eha_xx		eh					dative/benefactive	
7	idol		idol	idoh					idoh			id		evasive/circumlative	
8	e		vs	e					vs			ug	es	"at intervals"/"go sw. to _"	
8	ihl		ihl	ihih_x					ihis					"come here to _"	
9	g		g		x_h			g						progressive	
9	idi		idis											pre-incipient	(set B)
9	idena													"immediately"	
9	i	i	is											future	
10	v'i					v								past	
10	v'i					v								future imperative	
10	e'i					e								reportative	
10	esdi													future progressive	
10	o'i					o								habitual	
10	di													infinitive	(set B)
10	a													present	
11	gwu													"only, just, still"	
12	s(go)													interrogative	(Yes/No)
13	ju													interrogative	(also Yes/No but needs more information)
13	ke													"or" interrogative	(second verb; unlike english)
13	na													"and what if/about?"	
13	hv													"but"	(follows **sgo**)
13	isi													"or else"	
13	dina													concessive imperative	
13	dv													focus	

== Nouns ==
Nouns often occur as arguments of verbs. They can also be used predicatively, without a copular verb. Nouns are generally much less inflected than verbs. However, some nouns can occur with inflectional affixes similar to those found on verbs, mainly pronominal prefixes and the distributive prefix.

=== Prefixes ===
The number of prefixes nouns can take is comparably smaller than that of verbs, but since nouns can be used predicatively (nouns can be translated roughly as "to be X") they can occur with the pronominal prefixes that also occur on verbs, if not exchanged with one of the three below.

prefix	_C	_V	_u	meaning	
di	di	j	d	plural	(inanimate)
a				human	
n	ni	n		plural	(animate)

Thus plural words for humans take an(i)- as marker (even if the a was optional).

=== Conjugation - to be someone ===
For persons and their belongings normally set A prefixes are used. The second person forms also serve as vocative.

=== Possession - to belong to someone ===
Every bodypart has to be possessed, unless it is understood as detached or as a general image for example. The bodyparts take both set A and set B prefixes.

=== Kinship - to be someone in relation to someone ===
To explain kinship (or other relationships) the transitive compound pronouns are used. In this case the agent part expresses who it is (ex. I am a father) whilst the formerly patient part indicates to whom the relationship takes place (I-him-father = I, his father).

=== Suffixes ===
The same with the prefixes; the presented suffixes are exclusive for nouns, whilst these can also take numerous verb suffixes.

i	gwu	sgo	ju
hi		na	ke
ha			hv
ya'i			dv

The coverbal suffixes are applied after the pure noun suffixes.

suffix	a_	o_	
'i	x_o'i / x_v'i		locative/"place"
hi	x_ohi	x_v'i	
ha			partitive/"only"
ya'i	(x_iya'i)		"pure", "real"

== Adjectives ==
Adjectives can also be treated as verbs of certain qualities, they precede the noun they qualify.

== Adverbs ==
Adverbs are essentially adjectives preceding the qualified verb.
