= Japanese hortative form conjugation (mizenkei base) =

Japanese conjugation, like the conjugation of verbs of many other languages, allows verbs to be morphologically modified to change their meaning or grammatical function. In Japanese, the beginning of a word (the stem) is preserved during conjugation, while the ending of the word is altered in some way to change the meaning (this is the inflectional suffix). Japanese verb conjugations are independent of person, number and gender (they do not depend on whether the subject is I, you, he, she, we, etc.); the conjugated forms can express meanings such as negation, present and past tense, volition, passive voice, causation, imperative and conditional mood, and ability. There are also special forms for conjunction with other verbs, and for combination with particles for additional meanings.

Japanese verbs have agglutinating properties: some of the conjugated forms are themselves conjugable verbs (or i-adjectives), which can result in several suffixes being strung together in a single verb form to express a combination of meanings.

A revision sheet visually summarizing the conjugations and uses described below

Conjugable words (verbs, i‑adjectives, and na‑adjectives) are traditionally considered to have six possible conjugational stems or bases (活用形, katsuyōkei; literally "conjugation forms"). This article lists those from the negative base (未然形, mizenkei), as well as the tentative base (推量形/意思形, suiryōkei/ishikei) that was split off during the post‑WWII spelling reforms.

== Hortative ==
The hortative or volitional expresses the speaker's or speakers' personal or collective volition ("I think I will do it", "we think we will do it"), or invitation to others ("let's do it"), to do something. The same form, otherwise known as the tentative, conjectural or presumptive, expresses subjective speculation ("I think/presume that's the case") or supposition ("perhaps that's the case", "that could be the case"). The tentative meanings are increasingly outdated as later generations of speakers favor using darō, deshō, or de gozaimashō as less ambiguous tentative markers (more in the subsection below).

Hortative form example sentences
English	Japanese	Function
I'll put off this task for later.	Sono shigoto wa atomawashi ni shiyō (その仕事は後回しにしよう)	personal volition ("I'll/'m going to do it")
I'll overlook your mistake this time.	Konkai wa anata no machigai o ōme ni miyō (今回はあなたの間違いを大目に見よう)	personal volition ("I'll/'m going to do it")
We do not have the least intention to make up trendy slang.	Ryūkōgo o tsukurō nante ito wa, zenzen nai n desu (流行語を作ろうなんて意図は、全然ないんです)	collective volition ("we'll/'re going to do it")
The fact that man uses machines as tools means that man is to do what machines cannot.	Ningen ga kikai o dōgu to shite tsukau to yū koto wa, kikai ni wa dekin koto o ningen ga yarō to yū wake desu (人間が機械を道具として使うということは、機械にはできんことを人間がやろうというわけです)	collective volition ("we'll/'re going to do it")
It's getting late, let's go home.	Osoi kara kaerō (遅いから帰ろう)	invitation to act together ("let's do it")
Shall we go out for dinner?	Yūshoku o soto de tabeyō ka (夕食を外で食べようか)	invitation to act together ("let's do it")
There will probably be many objections at the meeting.	Kaigi de wa ōku no hanron ga dasareyō (会議では多くの反論が出されよう)	speculation ("I think it's the case") or supposition ("it might be the case; it's the case, isn't it?")
Any child could do that.	Donna kodomo de mo sore wa dekiyō (どんな子供でもそれはできよう)	speculation ("I think it's the case") or supposition ("it might be the case; it's the case, isn't it?")
"Sure. There are three 'will it's' in the heavens. Whaat are they?" "Ha ha ha. Easy. I learnt this in first grade. Are they 'will it shine,' 'will it rain' and 'will it cloud'?" (Note: The saying is sora ni mitsu rōka (空に三つ廊下; lit. 'the three corridors in the sky'). The rōka (廊下; 'corridor') is a pun on the interrogative tentative endings in Furō ka (降ろうか; 'Will it rain?'), Terō ka (照ろうか; 'Will it shine?') and Kumorō ka (曇ろうか; 'Will it cloud?'), which are what one would ask about the weather.)	"Yōshi. Ten ni mittsu no rō ka ga arimasu. Nan to nan to nān da." "Hahaha. Sonna no kantansa. Gakkō de ichinensei ni oshieta koto ga aru. Terō ka, furō ka, kumorō ka darō." (「よーし。天に三つのろうかがあります。なんとなんとなーんだ。」 「ははは。そんなのかんたんさ。学校で一年生におしえたことがある。照ろうか、降ろうか、くもろうかだろう？」)	speculation ("I think it's the case") or supposition ("it might be the case; it's the case, isn't it?")
and in the middle of the land rose a vast castle that seemed one mile long, with a row of awesome columns rising one above another.	Sō shite, kuni no mannaka ni wa, ichi-mairu mo arō ka to omowareru, hiroi oshiro ga sobiete ite, monosugoi hashira no rōka ga, ikutsu mo kasanariatte imashita. (そうして、国のまんなかには、一マイルもあろうかと思われる、ひろいお城がそびえていて、ものすごい柱のろうかが、いくつも重なりあっていました。)	speculation ("I think it's the case") or supposition ("it might be the case; it's the case, isn't it?")
"[…] Once you sublimate your wildly unruly passion into magical power, the flame you summon will surely be beautiful, won't it?"	"[…] Susamajii made no araburu jōnetsu o sono mama maryoku ni shōka sureba, omae ga yobidasu honō wa sazoya utsukushikarō?" (「[…]すさまじいまでの荒ぶる情熱をそのまま魔力に昇華すれば、お前が喚びだす炎はさぞや美しかろう？」)	speculation ("I think it's the case") or supposition ("it might be the case; it's the case, isn't it?")
If Anthony's love had been as egoistic as love generally is, it would have been greater than the egoism of his vanity—or of his generosity, if you like—and all this could not have happened. He would not have hit upon that renunciation at which one does not know whether to grin or shudder. It is true too that then his love would not have fastened itself upon the unhappy daughter of de Barral.	Moshi Antonī no ren'ai ga ippan ni sō de aru kurai rikoteki datta nara, sore wa kyoei no egoizumu ni――arui wa, mā, kandaisa ni――masattarō kara, kono issai wa okinakattarō. Niyatto warō beki na no ka zotto miburui su beki na no ka wakaranai, sonna dannen o omoitsuku koto mo nakattarō. Sono katei de wa, kare no ren'ai ga do Bararu no fukō na musume ni somosomo musubitsukanakattarō to yū no mono shin da. (もしアントニーの恋愛が一般にそうであるくらい利己的だったなら、それは虚栄のエゴイズムに――あるいは、まあ、寛大さに――まさったろうから、この一切は起きなかったろう。にやっと笑うべきなのかぞっと身震いすべきなのかわからない、そんな断念を思いつくこともなかったろう。その仮定では、彼の恋愛がド・バラルの不幸な娘にそもそも結びつかなかったろうというのも真だ。)	speculation ("I think it's the case") or supposition ("it might be the case; it's the case, isn't it?")
I told you not to be rough with them. (Note: "Didn't I tell you?," "I told you, didn't I?," "I thought I told you," etc.) You are far from being their equal.	Teara na mane wa suru na to itta 'rō Omaetachi ga taitō ni sesshite ii aite de wa nai zo (手荒な真似はするなと言ったろう お前たちが対等に接していい相手ではないぞ)	speculation ("I think it's the case") or supposition ("it might be the case; it's the case, isn't it?")

=== Hortative: Conjugation table ===
The so‑called "hortative form" is actually a combination of the mizenkei and the auxiliary う, which underwent systemic historical sound changes that affected all the examples below. These sound changes motivated the term godan ("five grade"), which replaced yodan ("four grade") (see Japanese godan and ichidan verbs § Godan vs yodan). For non‑godan verbs, during the final stage as shown in the table below, the vowels of the original mizenkei, i, e and o, were reintroduced in some dialects, especially eastern ones, which yielded the suffix ‑yō, as in iyō, eyō and koyō. Other dialects, especially western ones, did not undergo this development. Verbs with the vowel i in their stems may retain the forms ending in ‑yū (← ‑iu) in some dialects, hence okyu(u); or gained the normalized ‑yō in other dialects, hence okiyo(o), o(k)kyo(o). Yet other dialects have iro(o), ero(o) and koro(o). For suru in particular, the eastern vowel i is used rather than the western e, hence shiyō rather than seyō, the latter of which is found in some Chūbu dialects. The distributions of forms where the original mizenkei vowels were fused with u (okyū/okyō, akyō, nyō, kō, shō) and forms where the vowels were added back in (okiyō, akeyō, neyō, koyō, shiyō/seyō) are uneven among western dialects, where ichidan‑based forms with fused vowels are less widespread; notably, in Kyoto and Osaka Prefectures, the former capitals with historically prestigious dialects, the fused forms kō and shō are used for the irregular verbs, while the forms with the original vowels are used for ichidan verbs. Compare the three hortatives, only the first of which is distinctly western, in the following example: Oshierareru dake de naku, chan to jibun de benkyō shō. Jibun de jibun no jinsei o kaeyō, ganbarō, to jibun ni muchi o utta. (教えられるだけでなく、ちゃんと自分で勉強しょう。自分で自分の人生を変えよう、頑張ろう、と自分に鞭を打った。; transl. I whipped myself into studying properly, not just being taught; and changing my life on my own and doing my best.)

For ‑masu and desu, the unique shapes of ‑mashō and deshō, as well as of the negative ‑masen, suggest their provenance in western polite speech. While ‑masen undoubtedly has eastern counterparts, ‑mashinai/‑mashinē (albeit uncommon, archaic and stereotypical), ‑mashō (ましょう) and deshō (でしょう) do not seem to have any, in spite of such historical spellings as ましよう and でしよう, which appear to be pronounced *‑mashiyō and *deshiyō, but were rather variant spellings of ませう (‑mashō) and でせう (deshō), and in some older publications these spellings were inconsistently interchangeable. In contrast, suru, ‑masu's conjugational relative, has both western and eastern forms, as in sen/shinai/shinē, and shō/shiyō.

Due to the said historical sound changes, all hortative/tentative forms contain the long vowel ō, but it is susceptible to shortening into an o in speech, especially in dialects. In ichidan verbs, shortening results in the hortative/tentative and the imperative sharing the same segments (consonants and vowels), although they can still be distinguished by accent. All hortatives and tentatives are currently accentuated on the start of the ō, as in yobō (呼ぼう; [jòbó(ò)]), yobimashō (呼びましょう; [jòbímáɕó(ò)]), yondarō (呼んだろう; [jòńdáɾó(ò)]), yobanakarō (呼ばなかろう; [jòbánákáɾó(ò)]), etc. Thus the hortative ichidan okiyō (起きよう; [òkíjó(ò)]), akeyō (開けよう; [àkéjó(ò)]) are accentually distinct from the imperative ichidan okiyo (起きよ; [ókìjò]), akeyo (開けよ; [àkéjò]). On the other hand, since all hortatives are accentuated on the ō, ambiguity among themselves can arise, for example in kaō (買おう; 'let's buy', [kàóò], historically unaccentuated as [kàóó]) and kaō (飼おう; 'let's rear', [kàóò]). The western hortative kō ("let's come") also resembles the eastern imperative kō ("come!").

The common form of the hortative/tentative ends in う, but occasionally a classical (thus more elevated) alternative ending in む or ん turns up in modern writing, for example in Wareware wa sono no senkusha taran to suru ikigomi de yaru tsumori na n desu (我々はその先駆者たらんとする意気込みで遣るつもりなんです; transl. We intend to work with the ambition to become the pioneers in that). (Note: Taran is equivalent to taru darō, and taru is equivalent to the unfused classical to aru (see Japanese conjugation § Copulae: Conjugation table).) Both う and ん derive from the earlier む, but through different mechanisms: う is from the loss of a consonant in む, /mu → ũ → u/; while ん is from the loss of a vowel, /mu → N/. Since ん also happens to represent the western negative ‑n and the nominalizing particle no, the spelling ikan (行かん) represents either ikanu (行かぬ; 'not go') or ikamu (行かむ; 'let's go'), and shinan (死なん) represents not only shinanu (死なぬ; 'not die') or shinamu (死なむ; 'let's die') but also the noun phrase shi na no (死なの; 'it's that it's death'), the last of which contains the Sino‑Japanese noun shi (死; 'death'). Accentually, verbs whose dictionary forms are accentless can be distinguished, as in [ikaɴ] for "not go" and [ikáɴ] for "let's go"; but verbs whose dictionary forms are accented are ambiguous and context‑dependent, as in [kakáɴ] (kakan (書かん)) for both "not write" and "let's write." It is possible to keep the hortative and negative distinct in writing respectively as ‑n (ん) and ‑nu (ぬ), for example in Ga, seikō no kikai o toraen ni wa, kare wa mata tada ni shizuka ni sono chikaku o ugokasu bakari de naku, sorezore tekitō na jiki ni oite zuibun to daitan ni, hito no yōsu o dokuha seneba ikenu no de aru. (が、成功の機械を捉へんには、彼はまた啻に冷靜にその智覺を働かすばかりでなく、それ〲適當な時機に於て隨分と大膽に、他人の容貌を讀破せねばいけぬのである。; 'He must, however, to have his chance of success, be acutely besides calmly perceptive, a reader of features, audacious at the proper moment.'); or alternatively, by using ‑nai (ない) for the negative instead, as in Mizu ni oboren to suru mono, tasuke no ami o tōzen mono ni zenzaisan o ataen to yakushitari to sen ni, sore wa tōmen no kyōsei jōtai yamu naku yakusoku shita ni hoka naranai ga yue ni sono yakusoku o torikeshite yoroshikaru beku, (水に溺れんとする者、助けの網を投ぜん者に全財產を與へんと約したりとせんに、それは當面の强制狀態己むなく約束したに外ならないが故にその約束を取消して宜しかるべく、; transl. Suppose that a drowning man promises to give all his fortune to whoever willing to cast a net to help, that is no other than promising involuntarily in a coercive state at hand, thus he is well within his rights to retract such promise;).

Some idioms derived from the classical hortative/tentative include sen kata (為ん方・詮方; 'means', lit. 'method to do'; synonymous with shikata (仕方)), sen kata nai (為ん方無い・詮方無い; 'be helpless', lit. 'be without any means'), iwan kata nai/nashi (言わん方無い・無し; 'be inutterable', lit. 'be without any way to say'), aran kagiri (有らん限り; 'to the utmost', lit. 'limit of what could exist'), etc.

Most verbs have hortative meanings, as in shiyō/shimashō (しよう・しましょう; 'let's do it'), although this can be interpreted as self‑tentative ("I'll probably do it"). To express tentativity unambiguously, darō/jarō, de arō or deshō (or hyper‑politely, de gozaimashō), which is unambiguously tentative, is added, as in suru darō / suru deshō / shimasu deshō (するだろう・するでしょう・しますでしょう; 'he'll probably do it'). In some cases where the subject lacks human agency, the tentative meaning is more plausible, for example, kumorō/kumorimashō (曇ろう・曇りましょう) means "it'll probably be cloudy" tentatively, not *"let's be cloudy" hortatively; ame ga furō / ame ga furimashō (雨が降ろう・雨が降りましょう) means "it'll probably rain", not *"let's rain"; dekiyō/dekimashō (できよう・できましょう) means "probably can" not *"let's be able". These have been increasingly replaced by kumoru darō / kumoru deshō / kumorimasu deshō (曇るだろう・曇るでしょう・曇りますでしょう), ame ga furu darō / ame ga furu deshō / ame ga furimasu deshō (雨が降るだろう・雨が降るでしょう・雨が降りますでしょう) and dekiru darō / dekiru deshō / dekimasu deshō (できるだろう・できるでしょう・できますでしょう). The rise of the darō/deshō‑appended tentative, as in ame ga furu/furimasu deshō (雨が降る・降りますでしょう; 'it'll probably rain'), as a distinction in form from the original polysemous tentative/hortative, is attested from the early 19th century; the use of the original tentative, as in ame ga furimashō (雨が降りましょう), has become obsolescent or elevated.

Arō/arimashō and their derivatives tend to be tentative, and can be replaced with aru darō / aru deshō / arimasu deshō. The same applies to de arō / de arimashō, which can be replaced with de aru darō / de aru deshō / de arimasu deshō. Adjectival tentatives such as akakarō (赤かろう; 'it's probably red') with a built‑in arō can be replaced with akai darō/deshō (赤いだろう・でしょう). The eastern adjectival negative tentative ‑nakarō, as in yobanakarō (呼ばなかろう; 'probably not call'), ōkiku nakarō (大きくなかろう; 'probably not big') and hon de/ja nakarō (本で・じゃなかろう; 'probably not a book') are to be replaced with ‑nai darō/deshō (〜ないだろう・でしょう). The past tentative ‑ta/‑da darō/deshō are preferred to ‑tarō/‑darō, deshita deshō to deshitarō, and ‑mashita deshō to ‑mashitarō. However, ‑ta/‑da darō can be shortened back to ‑ta/‑da 'rō, albeit with different accent patterns; compare [táɾó(ò)] for ‑tarō, and [tá | dàɾó(ò) → tá | ɾó(ò)] or [tá dàɾò(ò) → tá ɾò(ò)] for ‑ta darō → ‑ta 'rō. This contraction is transferable to the polite ‑mashita 'rō, which is still not quite the same as ‑mashitarō, but which does suggest an unabbreviated form, ‑mashita darō, with a mismatch in politeness, compared to the well‑formed polite ‑mashita deshō. Martin (2004:606) doubted the plausibility of ‑mashita darō, but it is not impossible.

The western negative ‑n(u) and ‑zu take the classical ‑ji for occasional elevated use, mostly followed by the quotative particle to, as in Senshutachi wa kanko no koe ni okurarete, katazuba ikite kaeraji to yū iki de dete kite 'ru wake desu kara, ochiru to naku desu yo. (選手たちは歓呼の声に送られて、勝たずば生きて帰らじという意気で出てきてるわけですから、落ちると泣くですよ。; transl. The athletes, sent off by the cheering voices, appear with the spirit of "I shall not return alive unless I am victorious," so they weep when they lose.), as well as in some cliches such as okureji to (遅れじと; 'not to fall behind; not to be outdone'), makeji to (負けじと; 'not to lose; unyieldingly'), makeji tamashii (負けじ魂; 'unyielding spirit'), etc. The negative tentative/hortative has been expressed with the attributive followed by mai; in the particular case of ‑masen, there is ‑masu mai. In many non‑Tokyo eastern dialects, mai (← majii) is the negative counterpart of the affirmative be(e) (← bei), the regularly modernized adjectival form of beki, which the Tokyo dialect does not use for tentative or hortative meanings. ‑N darō/jarō/de arō/deshō and ‑masen deshō are also used.

Dictionary form	Pattern			Hortative form	Historical evolution
Godan and pseudo‑yodan verbs
結う (yuu/yū, fasten)	結う	結お	う	結おう (yuō, let's/probably fasten)	/amu → aũ → ɔː → oː/ /amu → aN/
結う (yuu/yū, fasten)	結う	結わ	ん む	結わん (yuwan, let's/probably fasten) 結わむ (yuwamu)	/amu → aũ → ɔː → oː/ /amu → aN/
言(い)う (yū, say)	ゆう	いお	う	言おう (iō, let's/probably say)	/amu → aũ → ɔː → oː/ /amu → aN/
言(い)う (yū, say)	ゆう	いわ	ん む	言わん (iwan, let's/probably say) 言わむ (iwamu)	/amu → aũ → ɔː → oː/ /amu → aN/
通う (kayou/kayō, commute)	通う	通お	う	通おう (kayoō, let's/probably commute)	/amu → aũ → ɔː → oː/ /amu → aN/
通う (kayou/kayō, commute)	通う	通わ	ん む	通わん (kayowan, let's/probably commute) 通わむ (kayowamu)	/amu → aũ → ɔː → oː/ /amu → aN/
拾う (hirou/hirō, pick up)	拾う	拾お	う	拾おう (hiroō, let's/probably pick up)	/amu → aũ → ɔː → oː/ /amu → aN/
拾う (hirou/hirō, pick up)	拾う	拾わ	ん む	拾わん (hirowan, let's/probably pick up) 拾わむ (hirowamu)	/amu → aũ → ɔː → oː/ /amu → aN/
勝つ (katsu, win)	勝つ	勝と	う	勝とう (katō, let's/probably win)	/amu → aũ → ɔː → oː/ /amu → aN/
勝つ (katsu, win)	勝つ	勝た	ん む	勝たん (katan, let's/probably win) 勝たむ (katamu)	/amu → aũ → ɔː → oː/ /amu → aN/
狩る (karu, hunt)	狩る	狩ろ	う	狩ろう (karō, let's/probably hunt)	/amu → aũ → ɔː → oː/ /amu → aN/
狩る (karu, hunt)	狩る	狩ら	ん む	狩らん (karan, let's/probably hunt) 狩らむ (karamu)	/amu → aũ → ɔː → oː/ /amu → aN/
有る (aru, exist)	有る	有ろ	う	有ろう (arō, probably exist)	/amu → aũ → ɔː → oː/ /amu → aN/
有る (aru, exist)	有る	有ら	ん む	有らん (aran, probably exist) 有らむ (aramu)	/amu → aũ → ɔː → oː/ /amu → aN/
下さる (kudasaru, give)	下さる	下さろ	う	下さろう (kudasarō, probably give)	/amu → aũ → ɔː → oː/ /amu → aN/
下さる (kudasaru, give)	下さる	下さら	ん む	下さらん (kudasaran, probably give) 下さらむ (kudasaramu)	/amu → aũ → ɔː → oː/ /amu → aN/
貸す (kasu, lend)	貸す	貸そ	う	貸そう (kasō, let's/probably lend)	/amu → aũ → ɔː → oː/ /amu → aN/
貸す (kasu, lend)	貸す	貸さ	ん む	貸さん (kasan, let's/probably lend) 貸さむ (kasamu)	/amu → aũ → ɔː → oː/ /amu → aN/
愛す (aisu, love)	愛す	愛そ	う	愛そう (aisō, let's/probably love)	/amu → aũ → ɔː → oː/ /amu → aN/
愛す (aisu, love)	愛す	愛さ	ん む	愛さん (aisan, let's/probably love) 愛さむ (aisamu)	/amu → aũ → ɔː → oː/ /amu → aN/
達す (tassu, reach)	達す	達そ	う	達そう (tassō, let's/probably reach)	/amu → aũ → ɔː → oː/ /amu → aN/
達す (tassu, reach)	達す	達さ	ん む	達さん (tassan, let's/probably reach) 達さむ (tassamu)	/amu → aũ → ɔː → oː/ /amu → aN/
書く (kaku, write)	書く	書こ	う	書こう (kakō, let's/probably write)	/amu → aũ → ɔː → oː/ /amu → aN/
書く (kaku, write)	書く	書か	ん む	書かん (kakan, let's/probably write) 書かむ (kakamu)	/amu → aũ → ɔː → oː/ /amu → aN/
嗅ぐ (kagu, smell)	嗅ぐ	嗅ご	う	嗅ごう (kagō, let's/probably smell)	/amu → aũ → ɔː → oː/ /amu → aN/
嗅ぐ (kagu, smell)	嗅ぐ	嗅が	ん む	嗅がん (kagan, let's/probably smell) 嗅がむ (kagamu)	/amu → aũ → ɔː → oː/ /amu → aN/
呼ぶ (yobu, call)	呼ぶ	呼ぼ	う	呼ぼう (yobō, let's/probably call)	/amu → aũ → ɔː → oː/ /amu → aN/
呼ぶ (yobu, call)	呼ぶ	呼ば	ん む	呼ばん (yoban, let's/probably call) 呼ばむ (yobamu)	/amu → aũ → ɔː → oː/ /amu → aN/
読む (yomu, read)	読む	読も	う	読もう (yomō, let's/probably read)	/amu → aũ → ɔː → oː/ /amu → aN/
読む (yomu, read)	読む	読ま	ん む	読まん (yoman, let's/probably read) 読まむ (yomamu)	/amu → aũ → ɔː → oː/ /amu → aN/
死ぬ (shinu, die)	死ぬ	死の	う	死のう (shinō, let's/probably die)	/amu → aũ → ɔː → oː/ /amu → aN/
死ぬ (shinu, die)	死ぬ	死な	ん む	死なん (shinan, let's/probably die) 死なむ (shinamu)	/amu → aũ → ɔː → oː/ /amu → aN/
Ichidan verbs
見る (miru, look)	見~~る~~	見	よう ん む	見よう (miyō, let's/probably look) 見ん (min) 見む (mimu)	/imu → iũ → juː → ijoː/ /imu → iN/
達しる (tasshiru, reach)	達し~~る~~	達し	よう ん む	達しよう (tasshiyō, let's/probably reach) 達しん (tasshin) 達しむ (tasshimu)	/imu → iũ → juː → ijoː/ /imu → iN/
察しる (sasshiru, guess)	察し~~る~~	察し	よう ん む	察しよう (sasshiyō, let's/probably guess) 察しん (sasshin) 察しむ (sasshimu)	/imu → iũ → juː → ijoː/ /imu → iN/
信じる (shinjiru, believe)	信じ~~る~~	信じ	よう ん む	信じよう (shinjiyō, let's/probably believe) 信じん (shinjin) 信じむ (shinjimu)	/imu → iũ → juː → ijoː/ /imu → iN/
進じる (shinjiru, give)	進じ~~る~~	進じ	よう ん む	進じよう (shinjiyō, let's/probably give) 進じん (shinjin) 進じむ (shinjimu)	/imu → iũ → juː → ijoː/ /imu → iN/
進ぜる (shinzeru, give)	進ぜ~~る~~	進ぜ	よう ん む	進ぜよう (shinzeyō, let's/probably give) 進ぜん (shinzen) 進ぜむ (shinzemu)	/emu → eũ → joː → ejoː/ /emu → eN/
出る (deru, exit)	出~~る~~	出	よう ん む	出よう (deyō, let's/probably exit) 出ん (den) 出む (demu)	/emu → eũ → joː → ejoː/ /emu → eN/
Irregular verbs
する (suru, do)	す~~る~~	し	よう	しよう (shiyō, let's/probably do)	/semu → seũ → sjoː → sijoː/ /semu → seN/
する (suru, do)	す~~る~~	しょ	う	しょう (shō, let's/probably do)	/semu → seũ → sjoː → sijoː/ /semu → seN/
する (suru, do)	す~~る~~	せ	ん む	せん (sen, let's/probably do) せむ (semu)	/semu → seũ → sjoː → sijoː/ /semu → seN/
勉強する (benkyō suru, study)	勉強す~~る~~	勉強し	よう	勉強しよう (benkyō shiyō, let's/probably study)	/semu → seũ → sjoː → sijoː/ /semu → seN/
勉強する (benkyō suru, study)	勉強す~~る~~	勉強しょ	う	勉強しょう (benkyō shō, let's/probably study)	/semu → seũ → sjoː → sijoː/ /semu → seN/
勉強する (benkyō suru, study)	勉強す~~る~~	勉強せ	ん む	勉強せん (benkyō sen, let's/probably study) 勉強せむ (benkyō semu)	/semu → seũ → sjoː → sijoː/ /semu → seN/
愛する (aisuru, love)	愛す~~る~~	愛そ	う	愛そう (aisō, let's/probably love)	/semu → seũ → sjoː → sijoː/ /semu → seN/
愛する (aisuru, love)	愛す~~る~~	愛し	よう	愛しよう (aishiyō, let's/probably love)	/semu → seũ → sjoː → sijoː/ /semu → seN/
愛する (aisuru, love)	愛す~~る~~	愛しょ	う	愛しょう (aishō, let's/probably love)	/semu → seũ → sjoː → sijoː/ /semu → seN/
愛する (aisuru, love)	愛す~~る~~	愛せ 愛さ	ん む	愛せん (aisen, let's/probably love) 愛さん (aisan) 愛せむ (aisemu) 愛さむ (aisamu)	/semu → seũ → sjoː → sijoː/ /semu → seN/
達する (tassuru, reach)	達す~~る~~	達そ	う	達そう (tassō, let's/probably reach)	/semu → seũ → sjoː → sijoː/ /semu → seN/
達する (tassuru, reach)	達す~~る~~	達し	よう ん む	達しよう (tasshiyō, let's/probably reach) 達しん (tasshin) 達しむ (tasshimu)	/semu → seũ → sjoː → sijoː/ /semu → seN/
達する (tassuru, reach)	達す~~る~~	達しょ	う	達しょう (tasshō, let's/probably reach)	/semu → seũ → sjoː → sijoː/ /semu → seN/
達する (tassuru, reach)	達す~~る~~	達せ 達さ	ん む	達せん (tassen, let's/probably reach) 達さん (tassan) 達せむ (tassemu) 達さむ (tassamu)	/semu → seũ → sjoː → sijoː/ /semu → seN/
察する (sassuru, guess)	察す~~る~~	察し	よう ん む	察しよう (sasshiyō, let's/probably guess) 察しん (sasshin) 察しむ (sasshimu)	/semu → seũ → sjoː → sijoː/ /semu → seN/
察する (sassuru, guess)	察す~~る~~	察しょ	う	察しょう (sasshō, let's/probably guess)	/semu → seũ → sjoː → sijoː/ /semu → seN/
察する (sassuru, guess)	察す~~る~~	察せ	ん む	察せん (sassen, let's/probably guess) 察せむ (sassemu)	/semu → seũ → sjoː → sijoː/ /semu → seN/
信ずる (shinzuru, believe)	信ず~~る~~	信じ	よう ん む	信じよう (shinjiyō, let's/probably believe) 信じん (shinjin) 信じむ (shinjimu)	/semu → seũ → sjoː → sijoː/ /semu → seN/
信ずる (shinzuru, believe)	信ず~~る~~	信じょ	う	信じょう (shinjō, let's/probably believe)	/semu → seũ → sjoː → sijoː/ /semu → seN/
信ずる (shinzuru, believe)	信ず~~る~~	信ぜ	ん む	信ぜん (shinzen, let's/probably believe) 信ぜむ (shinzemu)	/semu → seũ → sjoː → sijoː/ /semu → seN/
進ずる (shinzuru, give)	進ず~~る~~	進じ 進ぜ	よう ん む	進じよう (shinjiyō, let's/probably give) 進ぜよう (shinzeyō) 進じん (shinjin) 進ぜん (shinzen) 進じむ (shinjimu) 進ぜむ (shinzemu)	/semu → seũ → sjoː → sijoː/ /semu → seN/
進ずる (shinzuru, give)	進ず~~る~~	進じょ	う	進じょう (shinjō, let's/probably give)	/semu → seũ → sjoː → sijoː/ /semu → seN/
来る (kuru, come)	く~~る~~	こ	よう う ん む	来よう (koyō, let's/probably come) 来う (kō) 来ん (kon) 来む (komu)	/komu → koũ → koː → kojoː/ /komu → koN/
Verbal auxiliaries
〜ます(る) (‑masu(ru))	ます~~(る)~~	ましょ	う	〜ましょう (‑mashō, let's/probably …)	/semu → seũ → sjoː/ /semu → seN/
〜ます(る) (‑masu(ru))	ます~~(る)~~	ませ	ん む	〜ません (‑masen, let's/probably …) 〜ませむ (‑masemu)	/semu → seũ → sjoː/ /semu → seN/
です (desu, be)	です	でしょ	う	でしょう (deshō, probably be)	/semu → seũ → sjoː/ /semu → seN/
である (de aru, be) だ (da) じゃ (ja) や (ya)	である だ じゃ や	であろ だろ じゃろ やろ	う	であろう (de arō, probably be) だろう (darō) じゃろう (jarō) やろう (yarō)	/ni te aramu → de aɾamu → d(j)aɾamu → d(j)aɾaũ → d(j)aɾɔː → d(j)aɾoː/
〜た (‑ta) 〜たる (‑taru) 〜だ (‑da) 〜だる (‑daru)	たる だる	たろ だろ	う	〜たろう (‑tarō) 〜だろう (‑darō)	/te aɾamu → taɾamu → taɾaũ/daɾaũ → taɾɔː/daɾɔː → taɾoː/daɾoː/
Adjectives and adjectival auxiliaries
無い (nai, be nonexistent) 無かる (nakaru)	無かる	無かろ	う	無かろう (nakarō, be probably nonexistent)	/ku aɾamu → kaɾamu → kaɾaũ → kaɾɔː → kaɾoː/ /ku aɾamu → kaɾamu → kaɾaN/
無い (nai, be nonexistent) 無かる (nakaru)	無かる	無から	ん む	無からん (nakaran, be probably nonexistent) 無からむ (nakaramu)	/ku aɾamu → kaɾamu → kaɾaũ → kaɾɔː → kaɾoː/ /ku aɾamu → kaɾamu → kaɾaN/
良い (ii/yoi, be good) 良かる (yokaru)	良かる	良かろ	う	良かろう (yokarō, be probably good)	/ku aɾamu → kaɾamu → kaɾaũ → kaɾɔː → kaɾoː/ /ku aɾamu → kaɾamu → kaɾaN/
良い (ii/yoi, be good) 良かる (yokaru)	良かる	良から	ん む	良からん (yokaran, be probably good) 良からむ (yokaramu)	/ku aɾamu → kaɾamu → kaɾaũ → kaɾɔː → kaɾoː/ /ku aɾamu → kaɾamu → kaɾaN/
Special auxiliaries
〜ん (‑n) 〜ぬ (‑nu) 〜ず (‑zu)	ん ぬ ず	じ		〜じ (‑ji)	

=== Hortative: Grammatical compatibility ===
The hortative can be quoted with the quotative particle to, with to omou (と思う; 'I think that') in particular often being used to unambiguously convey volition (as opposed to invitation to act together), similarly to the desirative with ‑tai/‑tagaru; compare kaerō to omou (帰ろうと思う; 'I think I'll go home') and kaeritai to omou (帰りたいと思う; 'I feel like going home'). The extender to suru (とする) conveys imminent realization of volition, even for actions by inanimate agents.

The tentative can combine with ga or to (mo) to form the tentative concessive, with meanings similar to the gerundive concessive ‑te mo, the conditional concessive ‑edo and the imperative concessive ni shiro/seyo and de are.

The classical tentative is often followed by the particle bakari ("almost").

Hortative and tentative with extender
Extender	English	Japanese	Function
to (と)	At dusk when everybody gathered at the bus to go home, we somehow seemed to be two people short.	Yūgure ni natte, basu de zen'in ga kaerō to shūgō shite miru to, dō mo futari tarinai (夕暮れになって、バスで全員が帰ろうと集合してみると、どうも二人足りない)	unambiguous volition
to (と)	[I think] I'll try it out and buy it if I like it.	Tameshi ni tsukatte mite, yokattara kaō to omou (試しに使ってみて、よかったら買おうと思う)	unambiguous volition
to (と)	I thought I'd hit him good.	Yoppodo nagutte yarō to omotta (よっぽど殴ってやろうと思った)	unambiguous volition
to (と)	I had no thought of sleep.	Watashi wa nemurō to omowanakatta (私は眠ろうと思わなかった)	unambiguous volition
to (と)	I'm thinking of driving around the island in a rental car.	Rentakā de shima o doraibu shiyō to omotte 'masu (レンタカーで島をドライブしようと思ってます)	unambiguous volition
to (と)	He was calm. Somehow, his heart beat evenly, like that of a man determined to do something dangerous yet inevitable.	Kare wa ochitsuki haratte ita. Nani kashira, kiken na, shika mo sakeerarenai koto o shō to kesshin shita no yō ni, shinzō no kodō mo odayaka na mono de atta. (彼は落ちつき払っていた。何かしら、危険な、しかも避けえられないことをしょうと決心した人のように、心臓の鼓動もおだやかなものであった。)	unambiguous volition
to (と)	And thus if we, during the coming revolution, wish to leave the doors wide open to reaction, to monarchy perhaps, for us nothing beats confiding our affairs to a representative government, to a cabinet armed with all the powers that that government possesses today.	Sareba, moshi wareware ga, kuru beki kakumei ni saishite, handō no tame ni, osoraku wa ōsei no tame ni daimonko o kaihō shi okō to hossuru nara, wareware wa, daigi seifu ni, konnichi dōseifu ga yūsuru zenseiken o motte busō suru naikaku ni, wareware no jimu o inin suru ni shiku wa nai. (されば、若し吾々が、來るべき革命に際して、反動の爲に、恐らくは王政の爲に大門戶を開放し置かうと欲するなら、吾々は、代議政府に、今日同政府が有する全政權を以て武裝する內閣に、吾々の事務を委任するに如くはない。)	unambiguous volition
to (と)	Should you wish to make the Iliad, put yourself on diet.	Shokun ga Iriaddo o tsukuran to hosseba, mazu danjiki o serareyo. (諸君がイリアツドを作らんと欲せば、先づ斷食をせられよ。)	unambiguous volition
to (と)	Suppose that a drowning man promises to give all his fortune to whoever willing to cast a net to help, that is no other than promising involuntarily in a coercive state at hand, thus he is well within his rights to retract such promise;	Mizu ni oboren to suru mono, tasuke no ami o tōzen mono ni zenzaisan o ataen to yakushitari to sen ni, sore wa tōmen no kyōsei jōtai yamu naku yakusoku shita ni hoka naranai ga yue ni sono yakusoku o torikeshite yoroshikaru beku, (水に溺れんとする者、助けの網を投ぜん者に全財產を與へんと約したりとせんに、それは當面の强制狀態己むなく約束したに外ならないが故にその約束を取消して宜しかるべく、)	unambiguous volition
to suru (とする) to nasaru (となさる)	When he was about to board the train, someone called him from behind.	Densha ni norō to shita toki, ushiro kara koe o kakerareta (電車に乗ろうとしたとき、後ろから声をかけられた)	being about, being planning/intending, starting or trying to do something
to suru (とする) to nasaru (となさる)	He had a crack at singing.	Kare wa utatte miyō to shita (彼は歌ってみようとした)	being about, being planning/intending, starting or trying to do something
to suru (とする) to nasaru (となさる)	The electric clock in the office is about to go past three.	Jimusho no denkidokei wa sanji o sugiyō to shite iru (事務所の電気時計は三時を過ぎようとしている)	being about, being planning/intending, starting or trying to do something
to suru (とする) to nasaru (となさる)	But it isn't that the author couldn't get married, it is that she has no inclination to do so.	Da ga, chosha wa kekkon suru koto ga dekinakatta no de wa nakute, shiyō to shinai no de aru (だが、著者は結婚することができなかったのではなくて、しようとしないのである)	being about, being planning/intending, starting or trying to do something
to suru (とする) to nasaru (となさる)	Nobody tried/was about to open his mouth.	Dare mo kuchi o hirakō to shinakatta (誰も口を開こうとしなかった)	being about, being planning/intending, starting or trying to do something
to suru (とする) to nasaru (となさる)	The bus was not about to stop.	Basu wa tomarō to shinakatta (バスは止まろうとしなかった)	being about, being planning/intending, starting or trying to do something
to suru (とする) to nasaru (となさる)	The battle is about to begin.	Tatakai wa masa ni kaishi sen to shite iru (戦いはまさに開始せんとしている)	being about, being planning/intending, starting or trying to do something
to suru (とする) to nasaru (となさる)	Heaven has an end in all: yet, you that hear me, This from a dying man receive as certain: […] for those you make friends And give your hearts to, when they once perceive The least rub in your fortunes, fall away Like water from ye, never found again But where they mean to sink ye.	Nanigoto ni mo Ten'i ga hataraite iru. Shika shinagara, shokun yo, kore dake wa tashika na koto da to shite, shinan to suru mono no yū koto o kiite oite kudasai. […] Funkei bakugyaku no tomo to iedo mo hitotabi kimigata ga kudarizaka ni sashikakatta na to mitomeru to yū, to mizu no hikuki ni tsuku yō ni hanaresatte, sugata o misenaku narimasu zo, kimitachi o horobosō to de mo suru toki no hoka wa. (何事にも天意が働いてゐる。しかしながら、諸君よ、これだけは慥かな事だとして、死なんとする者のいふことを聽いておいて下さい。[…]刎頸莫逆の友と雖も一たび君がたが降り坂にさしかゝったなと認めるといふと、水の低きに就くやうに離れ去って、姿を見せなくなりますぞ、君たちを滅さうとでもする時の外は。)	being about, being planning/intending, starting or trying to do something
to suru (とする) to nasaru (となさる)	while all the time Nature is inviting you to talk earnestly with her, to understand her, to subdue her, and to be blessed by her!	Shikaru ni ippō Daishizen o miyo. Shizen wa nanji o shite onore (Shizen) to nesshin ni hanashi o kawasashimen to shite, onore o rikai seshimen to shite, onore o seifuku seshimen to shite, kakute onore yori kōfuku o toku seshimen to shite, tsune ni nanji o oide oide to maneite iru no de aru. (然るに一方大自然を見よ。自然は汝をして己れ（自然）と熱心に話をかわさしめんとして，己れを理解せしめんとして，己れを征服せしめんとして，かくて己れより幸福を得せしめんとして，常に汝を御出で御出でと招いて居るのである。)	being about, being planning/intending, starting or trying to do something
to suru (とする) to nasaru (となさる)	But perhaps because I seemed to hit it off with Mr Andō, Mr Andō himself was not the least inclined to consult other doctors.	Shika shi, Andō-san to wa uma ga au to yū no ka, Andō-san gojishin, hoka no isha ni maru de kakarō to nasaranai n desu (しかし、安藤さんとは馬が合うと言うのか、安藤さんご自身、ほかの医者にまるでかかろうとなさらないんです)	being about, being planning/intending, starting or trying to do something
ga (が)	Whether you go or not, I'll go.	Kimi ga ikō ga iku mai ga, ore wa iku (君が行こうが行くまいが、俺は行く)	concession
ga (が)	come hell or high water; lit. 'whether rain or spears fall'	ame ga furō ga yari ga furō ga (雨が降ろうが槍が降ろうが)	concession
ga (が)	She always listened to water boil, and whenever the pot got empty, come rain, wind or shine, she always refilled it.	Kanojo wa nengara nenjū, yu ga tagiru no o kiki, nabe ga karappo ni nareba, tatoe ame ga furō ga, kaze ga fukō ga, mata hi ga terō ga, nengara nenjū, soitsu o ippai ni shite kita no da. (彼女は、年がら年じゅう、湯がたぎるのを聞き、なべがからっぽになれば、たとえ雨が降ろうが、風が吹こうが、また日が照ろうが、年がら年じゅう、そいつをいっぱいにしてきたのだ。)	concession
ga (が)	Still, English or no, Galen could not justify simply attacking the party and killing the woman.	To ieba, Ingurando musume de arō ga nakarō ga, sono ikkō ni kishū o kake, MaGuregā no hanayome to naru musume o korosu koto ni seigi ga aru to wa, Geiran ni wa omoenakatta. (といえば、イングランド娘であろうがなかろうが、その一行に奇襲をかけ、マグレガーの花嫁となる娘を殺すことに正義があるとは、ゲイランには思えなかった。)	concession
ga (が)	That said, whether they're stronger or weaker than me, I still have to beat them eventually, so as long as I'm giving it my all, it doesn't really matter…….	Te ka, ore yori tsuyokarō ga yowakarō ga, kekkyoku taosanakya ikenai wake de, zenryoku tsukusu ore kara sureba, anmari kankei nai yō……. (てか、俺より強かろうが弱かろうが、結局倒さなきゃいけないわけで、全力を尽くす俺からすれば、あんまり関係ないような……。)	concession
to (mo) (と(も))	Whatever he does has no bearing on me.	Kare ga nani o shiyō to watashi ni wa mukankei da (彼が何をしようと私には無関係だ)	concession
to (mo) (と(も))	Come wind, storm, cold or rain, ――nothing struck him down.	Kaze ga fukō to arashi ga koyō to, samusa ya ame ga shūrai shiyō to,――nani mono mo dageki o ataeru koto wa nakatta. (風が吹こうと嵐が来ようと、寒さや雨が襲来しようと、――何ものも打撃を与えることはなかった。)	concession
to (mo) (と(も))	Come a hundred or myriad of you, no means no.	Hyakunin kō to, bannin kō to, dame tto ittara dame na no da. (百人來うと、萬人來うと、駄目つと云つたら駄目なのだ。)	concession
to (mo) (と(も))	Wherever you are, don't forget I'll be thinking of you.	Anata ga doko ni iyō to mo, watashi wa anata no koto o omotte iru no da to yū koto o wasurenai de ne (あなたがどこにいようとも、私はあなたのことを思っているのだということを忘れないでね)	concession
bakari (ばかり)	You might almost say it was your right. (Note: Iware here is likely a subject-exalting use of the passive.)	Anata no kenri na n da kara to iwaren bakari desu (あなたの権利なんだからと言われんばかりです)	almost/barely/virtually doing something; being just about to do something; being so close to doing something
bakari (ばかり)	It was an apology in which he kept groveling on the floor mat and all but wailed.	Tatami ni hitai o suritsuke suritsuke, gōkyū sen bakari no wabikata datta (畳に額を擦り付け擦り付け、号泣せんばかりの詫び方だった)	almost/barely/virtually doing something; being just about to do something; being so close to doing something
bakari (ばかり)	What surprised me was when the film got to the marathon part, the theater almost burst with frenzy.	Odoroita no wa, eiga no marason no tokoro ni naru to, gekijō ga waren bakari no nekkyō deshita yo (驚いたのは、映画のマラソンのところになると、劇場が割れんばかりの熱狂でしたよ)	almost/barely/virtually doing something; being just about to do something; being so close to doing something
bakari (ばかり)	Then he looked at me for a while, as I kept on silently thinking, and finally he spoke, barely suppressing a burst of laughter.	So shite kare wa, damatte kangaetsuzukete iru boku o chotto nagamete, tsui ni fukidasan bakari ni shite itta (そして彼は、黙って考え続けている僕をちょっと眺めて、ついに吹き出さんばかりにしていった)	almost/barely/virtually doing something; being just about to do something; being so close to doing something
bakari (ばかり)	In my true heart I find she names my very deed of love; Only she comes too short: (Note: She almost put it adequately.)	Aneue wa watakushi ga omotte oru tōri o osshatta no de gozaimasu no, tada, sukōshi ossharitarimasen bakari. (姉上はわたくしが思ってをる通りをおっしゃったのでございますの、只、少ゥしおっしゃり足りませんばかり。)	almost/barely/virtually doing something; being just about to do something; being so close to doing something

== See also ==
- Japanese negative form
- Japanese passive form
- Japanese potential form
- Japanese causative form
