= Volition (linguistics) =

Grammatical indication of intention

In linguistics, volition is a concept that distinguishes whether the subject, or agent of a particular sentence intended an action or not. Simply, it is the intentional or unintentional nature of an action. Volition concerns the idea of control and for the purposes outside of psychology and cognitive science, is considered the same as intention in linguistics. Volition can then be expressed in a given language using a variety of possible methods. These sentence forms usually indicate that a given action has been done intentionally, or willingly. There are various ways of marking volition cross-linguistically. When using verbs of volition in English, like "want" or "prefer", these verbs are not expressly marked. Other languages handle this with affixes, while others have complex structural consequences of volitional or non-volitional encoding.

== Linguistic approaches to volition ==
The way a particular language expresses volition, or control, in a sentence is not universal. Neither is any given linguist's approach to volition. Linguists may take a primarily semantic or primarily syntactic approach to understanding volition. Still others use a combination of semantics and syntax to approach the problem of volition.

=== The semantic approach ===
A semantic approach to a given problem is motivated by the notion that an utterance is composed of many semantic units (compositionality). Each of these units plays a role in the overall meaning of an utterance. The effect of this is such that when a semantic unit is changed or removed, the meaning of the utterance will differ in some way.

A semantic approach to volition disregards any structural consequences (this is handled by the syntactic approach) and focuses primarily on speaker-meaning, and what the listener understands. For example, when a language uses affixation to encode volition (the addition of a semantic unit), such as in the Sesotho language, it is possible to analyze the volitional component while overlooking the structural changes. Such an analysis would simply test the meaning difference with or without the volitional (verbal) affix (the semantic unit in question), as understood by the listener.

=== The syntactic approach ===
The hallmark of a syntactic approach to any problem is that it acknowledges various levels of structure. A syntactic approach to analyzing volition focuses primarily on structural change, and does not rely on either speaker meaning or the information understood by the listener in order to explain the phenomena.

In his analysis of the Squamish language, Peter Jacobs examines how transitive predicates are marked differently according to the degree of control an agent has over an event. Jacobs argues that the relationship between a predicate and its semantic interpretation is determined by syntax. Under this analysis, the difference between control and limited control predicates lies in the syntactic position of object agreement, with control predicates being associated with VP, and limited control predicates associated with a functional projection of aspect (which Jacobs refers to as FP-delimit).

As limited control predicates are associated with aspect, a telic (completion) reading is obtained. In these constructions, the speaker conveys that the agent managed to complete something despite a lack of control, or accidentally did something due to a lack of control. With control predicates, the object agreement is associated with the VP, so a non-telic reading is obtained. In this case, the speaker conveys that an action was initiated, and as the actor exercised control over the situation, the action was expected to be completed as a natural course of events. Whether or not the action was actually completed is not specified. Unlike semantic approaches, this and others based on syntax focus on the relationship between elements within the sentence structure hierarchy to explain differences in meaning.

=== The mixed approach ===
Simply put, the mixed approach is a combination of a syntactic and semantic approach. Neither is disregarded, and both are incorporated into the analysis. Such an approach can be found in the linguistic analysis of languages like Sinhala (see section 2.4). When analyzing volition in this language, linguists look at the semantics through the use of verbal morphology, changes in the words rather than the grammatical structures, in distinguishing between volitional and non-volitional events. In looking at the syntax, linguists analyze the use of case marking, which distinguishes between volitional and non-volitional agents of an event. When both these aspects of the language are analyzed simultaneously, a linguist is using a mixed approach. This is sometimes referred to as the syntax-semantics interface.

== Ways of marking volition ==
Languages use a variety of strategies to encode the presence or absence of volition. Some languages may use specific affixes on syntactic categories to denote whether the agent intends an action or not. This may, in turn, also affect the syntactic structure of a sentence in the sense that a particular verb may only select a volitional agent. Others, like English, do not have an explicit method of marking lexical categories for volition or non-volition.

=== Adverbs ===
Even though some verbs in English may seem like they can only be done intentionally, there are ways to alter the way they are understood. When English speakers want to be clear about whether an action was done intentionally or not, adverbs such as “intentionally”, or “accidentally” are included in the sentence. Examples are shown below.

(1) a.	I kicked her doll.
	The agent kicked the doll. It is ambiguous as to whether the action was done on purpose or not.
b.	I accidentally kicked her doll.
	The agent kicked the doll unintentionally
c.	I intentionally kicked her doll.
	The agent kicked the doll intentionally

Sentences in English cannot express both volitionality and non-volitionality for one action.

This is indicated by the following semantically ill-formed sentence using both kinds of adverbs:

d.	#I accidentally kicked her doll intentionally.

Note: Modern English seems to allow use of the "accidentally on purpose" construction to convey two separate volitional meanings. I kicked her doll accidentally on purpose would be +volitional to the listener but carries too, the implied request that the action be reported as -volitional to the indirect object.

=== Transitivity ===
==== Transitivity in English ====
In English, volition can be expressed by adding a phrase along the lines of “because I did something to it”. An entire situation using this type of sentence is then comprised, syntactically, of at least two separate events—the thing being done and the thing that caused it. That same sentence that used an additional clause can be expressed as a simple sentence, which can be considered a unitary event. The differences between the two sentence constructions deals in the transitivity of the verb. An example of each sentence form is shown below. In example a, 'topple' takes on only one argument, the subject. In example b, 'toppled' takes two arguments, the subject and the object'.

(2) a.	Intransitive
	'The aerial toppled because I did something to it.'
Event 1:	The aerial toppled.
Event 2:	I did something to it.
b.	Transitive
	'I toppled the aerial.'
Event 1:	'I toppled the aerial'
Event 2:	(This cannot be separated into two distinct clauses)

See control for more verb examples and Applicative voice for preposition examples on expressing causative intentions in English.

There are verbs in English where its volitional meaning is encoded in the lexical semantics in a speaker's lexical entry. The intentionality of a verb like ‘promise’ is part of what speakers of English know about the word.

Volition is prominent in active–stative languages with fluid-S. In a study by Matthew Rispoli, a psycholinguist, there are at least three aspects involved in the grouping transitive and intransitive verbs. They are case marking, theme animacy, and planning, as indicated by the appropriate use of verb suffixes denoting request, desire, and prohibition.

==== Case ====
Transitive and intransitive action verb groups share common conceptual ground. Here is an example taken from Japanese.

Intransitive

おもちゃ が 入った
omocha -ga haitta
toy -SBJ entered
'(The) toy entered'

Transitive

おもちゃ を 入れた
omocha -o ireta
toy -OBJ {put in}
'(Someone) put in (the) toy'

The transitive and intransitive action verb groups can be contrasted on a formal dimension of case marking because the two verb groups have different syntactic relations to the theme.

==== Theme Animacy ====
Semantic information about the theme may also contribute in distinguishing between the two groups of transitive and intransitive action verbs. Theme animacy is conceptualized as being based on a combination of features. The first is the biological fact of being animal, and the second is the ability to initiate self-movement. At one end of the scale are true animates, which are animal and are able to move on their own. At the opposite end are inert inanimates, which are neither animal nor able to move on their own. Between both ends of the scale is a gradient of things that vary in animacy, such as dolls and vehicles.

==== Planned Action ====
Certain non-syntactic aspects are common to all action verbs. Actions may be either planned or unplanned. The planning aspect is partially reflected in syntax by the agent or actor roles. An animate agent is a planner who instigates an action. The actors of intransitive verbs such as ’walk’, or ’sit’ are also planners. There are also some intransitive verbs, such as ’break’ and ’open’ which do not typically take animate themes, and the theme is not considered an actor or agent. It is possible that these intransitive verbs are not distinguished from transitive verbs on the basis of theme animacy, and their theme referents typically will be inanimate. However, these verbs are more likely to refer to unplanned actions, in which case they will not occur in requests, imperatives, desideratives or prohibitions. The interaction of theme animacy and the planned nature of an action provides the basis for distinguishing transitive from intransitive action verbs. Indicators of planning are the expressions of request, desire, or prohibition of action. Some languages, such as Japanese, do this with verb suffixes and auxiliaries.

=== Affixation ===
Affixes can be grouped into three types: prefixes, infixes, and suffixes. There is cross-linguistic evidence that all three types can be implicated in volitional marking.

==== Prefixation ====
Prefixes can be used to mark volition, as in Sesotho, a Bantu language spoken in South Africa. Sesotho uses a prefix, /ho/, which attaches to nouns, and creates a change in argument structure in volitional verbs to which the noun bearing the prefix is an argument. Observe the following data, adapted from Hogeweg (2010: 40):

Nouns derived from deverbal nouns

ho -nk -a -seabo
d.15 -take -FV part
'to participate/participating'

mo -nk -a -seabo
d.15 -take -FV -part
'participant'

==== Infixation ====
Other languages make use of infixes to encode volition. Dulong/Rawang is a group of Tibeto-Burman dialects spoken in China and Myanmar. In this language, volition is exemplified in the use of the valency-reducing reflexive/middle marker /-shì/ to transform transitive verbs into intransitive ones, with purpose (volition) expressly indicated in the semantic content of the morpheme. Observe the following data, adapted from LaPolla (2000: 289-295):

tv́l -ò -ē
roll -3+TR.N.PAST -N.PAST
'to roll'

tv́l -shì -ē
roll -R/M -N.PAST
'to roll oneself (on purpose; intransitive, but with intention)'

==== Suffixation ====
Other languages make use of suffixes as a way of marking volition. Tibetan, for example, has two main verb classes: volitional, and valency. There are four types of volitional verbs in Tibetan, two volitional and two non-volitional. These are expressly marked with suffixes. /yin/ is a suffix auxiliary morpheme which expressly indicates volition. Observe the following data, adapted from Tournadre (1991: 95):

(6) a.	Volitional
	pa.yin
	'I looked'
b.	Non-volitional (ungrammatical)
	*mthong-pa.yin
	'I saw'

=== Case marking ===
==== Semantics ====
Sinhala actively uses case marking as well as verb morphology to distinguish between volitional and non-volitional verbs. It has been argued that volition meanings are encoded in the lexicon, hence semantically. Sinhala verbs are classified semantically depending on whether they convey a controlled action or an uncontrolled action meaning. The differences between volitive and involutive verbs are apparent through their morphology and phonology. Depending on the verb classification, different theta roles are assigned. Class II verbs select agent subject theta roles. Class I and Class III verbs convey out-of-control actions (involitive) and select experiencer agent subject theta roles. Examples of the three different verb classes in Sinhala are shown below.

	Sinhala Verb Classes
(7) a.	Class I (Involitive)
	mære-
	'die'
b.	Class II (Volitive)
	mara-
	'kill'
c.	Class III (Involitive)
	marawa-
	'make kill'

==== Syntax-Semantics Interface ====
Linguists incorporate syntax into the approach to volition in Sinhalese by considering case role. Because volitive classed verbs do not assign case in Sinhala, the volitive case marker is determined by the finite T, which assigns nominative case. In order, then, for the subject to get case, the NP is required to undergo movement. Similarly, in a non-volitional construction, the involitive verb assigns dative case, used to say an external force caused the action, (or accusative case), which are indicated by the Sinhalese case marker [-tə] or [-wə], respectively .

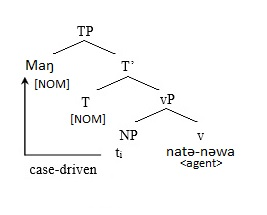
Syntactic tree of Sinhalese sentence

An example comparing a volitional event and a non-volitional event is shown below with the gloss and its English translation. An event can occur because of the agent's intention (a) or because of an external factor (b). In (a) the theta role assigned by the volitive verb is an agent. The agent acts intentionally. However, in (b), the theta role assigned by the involitive verb has been "demoted" to experiencer. The experiencer has no control over the action, but rather just experiences the event.

Maŋ natə -nəwa
1SG-NOM dance -IPFV
'I am dancing'

Ma -tə nætun -a
1SG -DAT dance.invol -PST
'I danced (for some external reason, such as being possessed by a spirit).'

Maa -wə næte -nəwa
1SG -ACC dance.invol -IPFV
'I am dancing (involuntarily).'

In Hindi, volition can be expressed with certain verbs, when the subject did something on purpose the subject noun gets the ergative case suffix. If the subject did not intend to do something, the subject noun is in the nominative case instead. The ergative case takes on the case marker indicated by [-ne].

Ram kʰãs-a
Ram.MASC.NOM cough-PRF.MASC.SG
'Ram coughed.'

Ram -ne kʰãs-a
Ram.MASC -ERG cough-PRF.MASC.SG
'Ram coughed (purposefully).'

=== Use of auxiliaries ===
Some languages use auxiliary verbs to specify that an action was done with volition. Auxiliary verbs may also be used to mark the opposite condition, a lack of volition or control.

Japanese is one language that exhibits both auxiliaries indicating volition and auxiliaries indicating lack of volition. The verb aru has a basic meaning of 'be' or 'stay' and is used with inanimate subjects. As an auxiliary verb, in the form -te-aru, it can be used in conjunction with verbs of volition to express that something is in a certain state as the result of some purposeful human intervention. In contrast, the verb iru can be used as an auxiliary with non-volitional intransitive verbs to simply indicate a state of being, without the element of volition. Iru also has a basic meaning of 'be' or 'stay', but is used with animate subjects. In this use as an auxiliary verb, iru appears in the form -te-iru.

木が 倒して ある
{ki ga} taoshite -aru
tree-NOM fell:TE‍-ASP NPAST
'the tree has been felled'

木が 倒れて いる
{ki ga} taorete -iru
tree-NOM fell:TE‍-ASP NPAST
'the tree has fallen (and, is lying on the ground)'

In contrast with the previous volition indicating and volition neutral auxiliaries, an auxiliary form of the verb しまう（shimau） ('finish, put away') can be used to mark a lack of volition. This auxiliary is used to mark a completed or habitual action with sense of regret, embarrassment, surprise, or lack of control. In casual speech, shimau may be shortened to ちゃう（-chau） (or ちゃった（-chat-ta） in the past) as seen in the first example.

ねじ 外れ ちゃっ た
neji hazure -chat -ta
screw come.off -SHIMAU‍ -PST
'the screw came off (to my surprise)'

暑い 日 には ビール を 飲んで しまう
atsui hi {ni wa} biiru o nonde -shimau
hot day TOP beer ACC drink.TE‍ -SHIMAU‍
'I end up drinking beer on a hot day (and I can’t help it)'

== See also ==
- Volitive modality
- Predicate
- Raising
- Control
- Applicative voice
- Thematic relation
  - Agent (grammar)
  - Patient (grammar)
- Morphosyntactic alignment
  - Nominative–accusative language
  - Ergative–absolutive language
  - Active–stative language
