= Agent (grammar) =

Cause or initiator of an event

In linguistics, a grammatical agent is the thematic relation of the cause or initiator to an event. The agent is a semantic concept distinct from the subject of a sentence as well as from the topic. While the subject is determined syntactically, primarily through word order, the agent is determined through its relationship to the action expressed by the verb. For example, in the sentence "The little girl was bitten by the dog", girl is the subject, but dog is the agent.

The word agent comes from the present participle agens, agentis ('the one doing') of the Latin verb agere, to 'do' or 'make'.

== Theory ==
Typically, the situation is denoted by a sentence, the action by a verb in the sentence, and the agent by a noun phrase.

For example, in the sentence "Jack kicked the ball", Jack is the agent and the ball is the patient. In certain languages, the agent is declined or otherwise marked to indicate its grammatical role. Modern English does not mark the agentive grammatical role of a noun in a sentence. Although certain nouns do have a permanent trait of agency (runner, kicker, etc.), an agent noun is not necessarily an agent of a sentence: "Jack kicked the runner".

For many people, the notion of agency is easy to grasp intuitively but difficult to define: typical qualities that a grammatical agent often has are that it has volition, is sentient or perceives, causes a change of state, or moves. The linguist David Dowty included these qualities in his definition of a Proto-Agent, and proposed that the nominal with the most elements of the Proto-Agent and the fewest elements of the Proto-Patient tends to be treated as the agent in a sentence. This solves problems that most semanticists have with deciding on the number and quality of thematic roles. For example, in the sentence His energy surprised everyone, His energy is the agent, even though it does not have most of the typical agent-like qualities such as perception, movement, or volition. Even Dowty's solution fails for verbs expressing relationships in time:

(1) April precedes May. vs: (2) May follows April.

Here what is agent and what is patient must be specified for each individual verb.

The grammatical agent is often confused with the subject, but the two notions are quite distinct: the agent is based explicitly on its relationship to the action or event expressed by the verb (e.g. "He who kicked the ball"), whereas the subject is based on a more formal title using the theory of the information flow (e.g. "Jack kicked the ball"). In the sentence "The boy kicked the ball", the boy is the agent and the subject. However, when the sentence is rendered in the passive voice, "The ball was kicked by the boy", the ball is the grammatical subject, but the boy is still the agent. Many sentences in English and other Indo-European languages have the agent as subject.

The use of some transitive verbs denoting strictly reciprocal events may involve a conflation of agent and subject. In the sentence "John met Sylvia", for example, though both John and Sylvia would equally meet Dowty's definition of a Proto-Agent, the co-agent Sylvia is downgraded to patient because it is the direct object of the sentence.

== See also ==
- Active–stative language
- English passive voice
- Passive voice
- Patient (grammar)
