= Patient (grammar) =

Semantic role

In linguistics, a patient, also called the target or undergoer, is the semantic role representing the participant of a situation upon whom an action is carried out, or the thematic relation such a participant has with an action.

Sometimes, theme and patient are used to mean the same thing. When used to mean different things, patient describes a receiver that changes state ("I crushed the car") and theme describes something that does not change state ("I have the car"). By that definition, stative verbs act on themes, and dynamic verbs act on patients.

== Theory ==
Typically, the situation is denoted by a sentence, the action by a verb in the sentence, and the patient by a noun phrase.

For example, in the sentence "Jack ate the cheese", the cheese is the patient. In certain languages, the patient is declined for case or otherwise marked to indicate its grammatical role. In Japanese, for instance, the patient is typically affixed with the particle o (hiragana を) when used with active transitive verbs, and the particle ga (hiragana が) when used with inactive intransitive verbs or adjectives. Although Modern English does not mark grammatical role on the noun (it uses word order), patienthood is represented irregularly in other ways; for instance, with the morphemes "-en", "-ed", or "-ee", as in eaten, used, or payee.

The grammatical patient is often confused with the direct object. However, there is a significant difference. The patient is a semantic property, defined in terms of the meaning of a phrase; but the direct object is a syntactic property, defined in terms of the phrase's role in the structure of a sentence. For example, in the sentence "The dog bites the man", the man is both the patient and the direct object. By contrast, in the sentence "The man is bitten by the dog", which has the same meaning but different grammatical structure, the man is still the patient, but now stands as the phrase's subject; and the dog is only the agent.

== See also ==
- Active–stative alignment
