= Charles Jago =

Canadian historian and academic

Charles Joseph Jago CM OBC (born 1943) is a Canadian academic and university administrator.

He was born and raised in St. Catharines, Ontario. He received his BA in Honours English and History from the University of Western Ontario in London, Ontario in 1965 and his PhD in History from Trinity College, Cambridge in 1969. His academic field is early-modern Spanish history.

He received his first academic position at Georgian College of Applied Arts and Technology in Barrie, Ontario in 1969. The next year he moved to the Department of History at McMaster University in Hamilton, Ontario as Assistant Professor where he remained until 1987. In 1987, he was appointed Principal of Huron University College where he served for eight years before moving to the University of Northern British Columbia to succeed Geoffrey Weller as president.

Jago retired as President of the University of Northern British Columbia at the end of academic year 2005–2006. On the resignation of his successor, Don Cozzetto, in June 2008 he was appointed Interim President of UNBC, serving in this position until a new president, George Iwama, took over in July 2009. Dr. Jago was appointed to the Northern Health Board in August 2007. His current term expires in December 2015.

Currently acting as mediator between the BCTF and Ministry of Education over the current Bill 22 and teachers dispute in B.C.

He was awarded the Order of Canada June 29, 2005, the Order of British Columbia in 2013, the Queen Elizabeth II Golden Jubilee Medal in 2002 and the Queen Elizabeth II Diamond Jubilee Medal in 2012.
