= Japanese conjugation (imperfective form) =

Element of Japanese language

Japanese conjugation, like the conjugation of verbs of many other languages, allows verbs to be morphologically modified to change their meaning or grammatical function. In Japanese, the beginning of a word (the stem) is preserved during conjugation, while the ending of the word is altered in some way to change the meaning (this is the inflectional suffix). Japanese verb conjugations are independent of person, number and gender (they do not depend on whether the subject is I, you, he, she, we, etc.); the conjugated forms can express meanings such as negation, present and past tense, volition, passive voice, causation, imperative and conditional mood, and ability. There are also special forms for conjunction with other verbs, and for combination with particles for additional meanings.

Japanese verbs have agglutinating properties: some of the conjugated forms are themselves conjugable verbs (or i-adjectives), which can result in several suffixes being strung together in a single verb form to express a combination of meanings.

A revision sheet visually summarizing the conjugations and uses described below

The imperfect(ive), present or non‑past form is broadly equivalent to the present and future tenses of English. In Japanese, the imperfective form is used as the headword or lemma, hence the name dictionary form. The terms conclusive, concluding, final, predicative, etc. are used for any form that occurs at the end of a sentence, whether imperfect or perfect; and attributive, adnominal, adjectival, substantival, etc. for any form that occurs before a noun. However, in modern Japanese, only the imperfect makes this distinction between "conclusive" and "attributive" in certain cases, particularly in adjectives (more in the subsection below) and copulae; conclusives and attributives are more distinct in classical Japanese.

The imperfect, when used as a predicate (the "conclusive"), generally conveys a present time, an existent habit, a future time and the historical present, which coincides with the simple present and various ways to express the future ("will do," "be going to do," "be doing") in English. However, for certain verbs, the simple imperfect does not suffice to express the same idea as the English "simple present," and the gerundive ‑te iru is required, thus gakusha ga sugurete iru (学者が優れている; 'the scholar excels'), not *gakusha ga sugureru (学者が優れる). Before a noun (the "attributive"), it may be the perfect ‑ta that expresses the "simple present," as in sugureta gakusha (優れた学者; 'a scholar who excels'). In yet more complex sentence, the simple imperfect is expected, such as Kono bun'ya de gakusha ga sugureru to sugu mitomerareru deshō (この分野で学者が優れるとすぐ認められるでしょう; 'If a scholar excels in this field he will be recognized at once'). Polysemous verbs may or may not require the gerund depending on the various senses that they possess.

Imperfective form example sentences
English	Japanese	Function
Everybody dies.	Hito wa dare de mo kanarazu shinu (人は誰でも必ず死ぬ)	eternal fact
a person who loves nature	shizen o aisuru hito (自然を愛する人)	eternal fact
I would sacrifice my life without hesitation for someone I loved.	Aisuru hito no tame nara inochi o sutete mo oshiku wa nai (愛する人のためなら命を捨てても惜しくはない)	eternal fact
All the trains bound for Tokyo are terribly overcrowded.	Tōkyō e iku ressha wa dore mo hidoi komi yō desu (東京へ行く列車はどれもひどい混みようです)	eternal fact
Our cat's tail is black at the tip.	Uchi no neko wa o no saki ga kuroi (うちの猫は尾の先が黒い)	eternal fact
Before my eyes a black cat dashed across my path.	Me no mae o kuroi neko ga totsuzen yogitta (目の前を黒い猫が突然よぎった)	eternal fact
I have bitter memories of that summer.	Watashi ni wa ano natsu no nigai omoide ga aru (私にはあの夏の苦い思い出がある)	present state
This can be illustrated from my own personal experience.	Kono koto wa watashi jishin no taiken kara mo reishō dekiru (このことは私自身の体験からも例証できる)	present state
I'm so annoyed that I feel like crying. (Note: Vexingly, tears come out.)	Kuyashikute namida ga deru. (悔しくて涙が出る。)	present state
I saw a red light ahead.	Mae ni akai tōka ga mieta (前に赤い灯火が見えた)	present state
It's that time of year when saury is at its tastiest.	Sanma ga oishii kisetsu ni narimashita (サンマがおいしい季節になりました)	present state
I go abroad at my own expense.	Kaigai ryokō wa jibun no kane de iku (海外旅行は自分の金で行く)	existent habit
I usually go swimming in the ocean every summer.	Natsu wa taitei kaisuiyoku ni iku (夏は大抵海水浴に行く)	existent habit
I'll go to Osaka on the first flight tomorrow morning.	Ashita asa ichiban de Ōsaka ni iku (明日朝一番で大阪に行く)	future action
Hi there, where are you going?	Kore, doko e iku (これ、どこへ行く)	future action
They will liquidate the company by the end of next February.	Rainen nigatsumatsu made ni kaisha o seisan suru. (来年二月末までに会社を清算する。)	future action

== Conjugation table ==
Historically, the vowel u systemically fused with its preceding vowel into one long vowel, which yielded such pronunciation as Tōkyō (東京; /toukjau → toːkjoː/). These fusions are complete in some western dialects, but others still make exceptions for verbs ending in u. Compare the following, whereby the unfused forms are listed first: au, ō (会う; 'meet'), iwau, iō (祝う; 'celebrate'), ou, ō (負う; 'carry'), ōu, oō (覆う; 'cover'). In classical Japanese, the fused forms are traditionally used, regardless of the kana spelling, which is the case for not only the said example godan verbs, but also nidan verbs such as kangō (考(かんが)ふ; = kangaeru; 'deliberate'), although modern Tokyo speakers may rather use the spelling pronunciation kangau. Some highly elevated verbs such as tamau, tamō (給う; 'bestow') and notamau, notamō (宣う; 'say') accept the fused forms as standard rather than dialectal alternatives. Fusions occur more extensively for the gerund and perfective.

Among verbs ending in the vowel u, the verb 言う・云う exceptionally only takes the fused form yū, never the unfused *iu, not even in careful speech. Despite the pronunciation, its standard kana spelling is still いう, not ゆう, (although the latter is still listed in dictionaries, and can be used, apart from ゆー or just ゆ, as a nonstandard alternative to reflect the actual pronunciation). This convention, along with the particles wa (は), e (へ) and o (を), is retained from historical kana orthography for practical purposes. For yū (言う), the kana spelling いう is in keeping with other conjugational forms such as iwanai (いわない) and itta (いった). 言(い)う (yū; 'say') is possibly homophonous with 結(ゆ)う (yuu → yū; 'fasten'), except that the latter can be unaccented or accented, while the former is only unaccented. In this article, the more phonetically accurate spelling ゆう is used in the conjugation tables below not to obscure phonetic changes between verb forms. The yu‑ resulting from the fusion in yū has begun to spread to other forms, such as yuwa‑, yutte and yutta, whose statuses are certain, although the statuses of yui, yue and especially yuō are dubious. It has been claimed that there are dialects where yui nagara, yueba and yue have occurred.

Aru is now a full-fledged godan verb, but it used to belong to an irregular class called "r-row irregular conjugation" (ラ行変格活用, ra-gyō henkaku katsuyō) in classical Japanese. Although having been long displaced by its attributive aru, its distinct conclusive ari lingers on in some proverbial cliches, such as kono chichi ni shite kono ko ari (この父にしてこの子あり; transl. like father, like son), jinsei yama ari tani ari (人生山あり谷あり; transl. life has peaks and valleys), etc., or the pseudoclassical baseball cliche pinchi no ato ni chansu ari (ピンチの後にチャンスあり; transl. after a crunch comes a chance).

Certain ‑suru or ‑zuru verbs and their godan and ichidan equivalents are interchangeable (or at least sensitive to specifically what follows them) and even used in the same text, although it has been claimed that, at least for the conclusive/attributive form, the more classical/literary (文語, bungo)/western ‑zuru variants are more "formal" and "basically a written form", compared to the more modern/colloquial (口語, kōgo)/eastern ‑jiru variants. The ‑su variants are highly inconsistent across verbs, and even for highly "godan‑ized" verbs like aisuru (愛する), whose other forms are predominantly godan, the conclusive/attributive aisuru and conditional aisureba in particular are still preferred to the fully godan variants aisu and aiseba. In some cases it is not clear whether aisu is godan or actually pseudo-classical, for example in aisu beki (愛すべき) where all ‑suru verbs can optionally lose the ru. In classical or pseudo-classical literature, aisu is more likely to be conclusive and aisuru is more likely to be attributive or nominalized.

The extenders beshi, beki, beku, mai, maji, majiki, majiku, etc., can stylistically take classical conclusives before them, including the irregular su (す; 'do') (Note: According to one survey, there is a preference for su over suru in particular. The preference for su beki in particular has also been adopted by some authorities for official purposes.) and ku (来; 'come'), and the nidan u (得; 'get'), tabu (食ぶ; 'eat'), kazou/kazō (数ふ; 'count'), otsu (落つ; 'fall'), etc. These can be substituted with the modern irregular suru (する) and kuru (来る), and the ichidan eru (得る), taberu (食べる), kazoeru (数える), ochiru (落ちる), etc. Some governmental institutions have shifted away from the nidan style (uku beki (受くべき; 'ought to receive')) in favor of the ichidan style (ukeru beki (受けるべき)). With the classical irregular conclusive ari (あり; 'exist') and its derivatives, however, the attributive is used instead, as in aru beki (あるべき; 'ought to be'), yokaru beki (良かるべき; 'ought to be good'), etc. rather than *ari beki, *yokari beki, etc., and such exceptions coincide with the modern godan conclusives ending in aru of the same verbs and adjectives.

The irregular and nidan verbs all have attributives distinct from conclusives, which have been employed in writing for literary flair. However, the current convention is to steer away from these elevated archaisms, which means that instead of a classical nidan conclusive like the passive shinobaru (偲ばる; 'be recalled') and a nidan attributive like shinobaruru (偲ばるる), a modern ichidan conclusive/attributive like shinobareru (偲ばれる) is recommended.

When used in modern Japanese, nidan verbs are only formally distinct from their ichidan counterparts in their conclusives, attributives and provisionals, which all contain the vowel u instead of i or e. Certain nidan verbs, such as iku (生く) (Note: This also has a yodan counterpart.) and nobu (伸ぶ), may have two ichidan counterparts for each, one being kamiichidan ("upper unigrade") with the vowel i, and the other being shimoichidan ("lower unigrade") with the vowel e, and they may differ in transitivity, which is made morphologically obvious in the ichidan conclusives, attributives and provisionals compared to their nidan ancestors.

The attributive expression iwayuru (所謂; 'so-called') derives from the attributive of iwayu (言はゆ; 'be said'), which in turn is an archaic e-stemmed nidan passive, equivalent to the archaic/elevated nidan iwaru(ru) and the modern ichidan iwareru, of yū (言う; 'say').

Since nidan verbs can be used before extenders, so-called "yodan verbs" presumably can as well, but as their conclusives/attributives are indistinguishable from so-called "godan verbs," it is rather a matter of classical fused pronunciation versus modern unfused pronunciation than truly distinct verb forms.

The classical forms of the now ichidan verb dekiru (出来る; 'come into existence; be possible') are deku and dekuru (出来る), which belong to the same irregular class as ku and kuru (来る; 'come'). While deku can be used before beki, etc as in deku beki, etc, it is also possible to use the infinitive deki instead as in deki beki, etc.

The verb shinu (死ぬ; 'die') is now a full-fledged godan verb in mainstream Japanese, but it used to belong to its own irregular class (na‑gyō henkaku katsuyō (ナ行変格活用; 'n‑row irregular conjugation')) with the now obsolete inu (往ぬ; 'go'). It had a distinct attributive and provisional which have been used elevatedly.

The classical attributives of ‑ta/‑da are ‑taru/‑daru, which have been used elevatedly just like nidan attributives (compare the copular attributive na(ru)). The classical ‑tari/‑dari are not really used conclusively as true conclusives, where the modern ‑ta/‑da are still preferred; the formally identical infinitives ‑tari/‑dari evolved into modern representatives.

The politeness auxiliary ‑masuru is characterized as "pseudo-literary" or faux archaic. It was used in parliamentary speech during the 20th century, but usage drastically declined into the 21st century. Some examples include Wakayama ni orimasuru haha (和歌山に居りまする母; 'my mother who is in Wakayama'), Taku e de mo maitte iru yō ni itasō ka to zonjimasuru no de gozaimasu (宅へでも参っているように痛そうかと存じまするのでございます; 'I am wondering whether I should decide to come and stay perhaps at your house'), Sore ni gisei no tame o omotte mimasuru to, geshuku ni okimasu no wa ikaga de gozaimashō (それに犠牲の為を思って見ますると、下宿に置きますのはいかがでございましょう; 'And thinking of the victims' welfare, how about putting them in a boarding house?'). The conjugational similarity between ‑masu and suru suggests an etymological link.

The sound sequence /Vi/, with /V/ being a vowel, is often colloquially and masculinely fused into a long vowel. Since all adjectival conclusive/attributive forms have this sound sequence, they are liable to such fusion. Most adjectives of this kind remain distinctly masculine, and their phonetic spellings are found in written dialog for masculine characters in fiction, such as nai → nē (ねえ・ねー; 'nonexistent'), urusai → urusē → ussē (うるせえ・うるせー・うっせえ・うっせー; 'noisy; pesky'), hayai → ha(y)ē (はええ・はえー; 'quick'), sugoi → sugē (すげえ・すげー; 'superb'), tsuyoi → tsu(y)ē (つええ・つえー; 'strong'), warui → warī (わりい・わりー; 'bad'), yasui → yashī (やしい・やしー; 'easy; cheap'), mazui → majī (まじい・まじー; 'unpalatable'), atsui → achī (あちい・あちー; 'thick; hot'), kayui → kaī (かいい・かいー; 'itchy'), etc. Non-masculine examples include yoi → (y)ē → ī (いい・いー; 'good'), and kawayui → kawaī (かわいい・かわいー; 'adorable'). See Japanese phonology § Vowel fusion for further citations.

The classical conclusives nashi and yoshi in particular are now more of cliches rather than catch-all representatives of adjectives in general. Nashi is often used as a nominal suffix meaning "without", "‑less" or "‑free", as in satō nashi no jōzai (砂糖なしの錠剤; 'sugar-free tablet'). Yoshi is often used as an interjection meaning "Good!" or "Alright!". The classical onaji has evolved into an adjectival noun (onaji da/de aru/desu, onaji (na), etc.), and despite being originally conclusive, it is now prevalently attributive. Other examples of classical conclusives for cliched, proverbial and elevated uses include Tenki wa yoshi, kaze wa nashi, buratsuku no ni motte koi no hi da (天気はよし、風はなし、ぶらつくのに持ってこいの日だ; transl. The weather's nice, there's no wind, it's the perfect day to stroll), Genkin fuyō jidai, chikashi de aru (現金不要時代、まさに近しである; transl. The cashless era is nigh), Eyasuki mono wa ushinaiyasushi (得やすきものは失いやすし; transl. Easy come, easy go), Kyū kābu Jiko ōshi (急カーブ 事故多し; transl. Sudden curve: Many accidents), etc.

The classical attributive ending ‑ki, the ancestor of the modern attributive/conclusive ending ‑i, is still used in elevated cliches and titles for books and fictional characters, such as jinkaku naki shadan (人格無き社団; 'unincorporated association'), Osorenaki Tansasha, Akiri (恐れなき探査者、アキリ; 'Akiri, Fearless Voyager'), furuki yoki jidai (古き良き時代; 'the good old days'), yoki Samariya‑bito/‑jin / hitsujikai (善きサマリヤ人・羊飼い; 'the good Samaritan / shepherd'), Utsukushiku Aoki Donau (美しく青きドナウ; 'The Beautiful Blue Danube'), Aoki Me no Otome (青き眼の乙女; transl. Maiden with Eyes of Blue), Akaki Ryū (赤き竜; transl. Crimson Dragon), Atarashiki Mura (新しき村; lit. 'New Village'), Imawashiki Tsurīfōku (忌まわしきツリーフォーク; 'Ambominable Treefolk'), etc.

The attributive ending ‑karu, a fusion of the infinitive ending ‑ku and the verb aru, is uncommon in modern Tokyo Japanese. It has been found in such constructions with ‑beki as tanoshikaru beki (楽しかるべき; transl. that ought/is supposed to be joyful; that is otherwise happy). In Kyushu, ‑karu was reduced further to ‑ka, and yoka is used instead of either yoi or yoshi. (Note: These lines are spoken by a character from Kagoshima Prefecture.)

Note that not all adjectives have classical counterparts. For example, 大きい (ōkii; 'is large') is a modern adjective with no classical counterpart to speak of, (Note: Notice how no classical counterpart is listed on this webpage. Compare 小さい(ちいさい) (chiisai; 'is small') whose classical counterpart is 小さし(ちひさし) (chiisashi).) which means such forms as ōkiki and ōkikaru are merely pseudo-classical.

The classical adjectival extenders beshi, gotoshi and maji are still used in elevated language. Their attributives retain the ‑ki ending as in beki, gotoki, majiki, although the ‑i ending as in bei, majii has historically and dialectally occurred. For beshi in particular, its attributive beki can be used conclusively in the phrase beki da/de aru/desu. For more examples, see #Imperfective: Grammatical compatibility below.

Conclusive form	Attributive form	Interchangeable counterpart
Godan and pseudo-yodan verbs
結う (yuu/yū, fasten)
言(い)う (yū, say)
会う (au/ō, meet)
祝う (iwau/iō, celebrate)
紛う (magau/magō, mistake)
給う (tamau/tamō, bestow)
宣う (notamau/notamō, say)
負う (ou/ō, carry)
覆う (ōu/oō, cover)
勝つ (katsu, win)
狩る (karu, hunt)
有る (aru, exist)
貸す (kasu, lend)
愛す (aisu, love)		愛する (aisuru)
達す (tassu, reach)		達する (tassuru)
書く (kaku, write)
嗅ぐ (kagu, smell)
呼ぶ (yobu, call)
読む (yomu, read)
死ぬ (shinu, die)
Ichidan verbs
見る (miru, look)
強いる (shiiru, coerce)
悔いる (kuiru, regret)
落ちる (ochiru, fall)
閉じる (tojiru, close)
達しる (tasshiru, reach)		達する (tassuru)
察しる (sasshiru, guess)		察する (sassuru)
信じる (shinjiru, believe)		信ずる (shinzuru)
進じる・進ぜる (shinjiru/shinzeru, give)		進ずる (shinzuru, give)
出来る (dekiru, come into existence / be possible)
生きる (ikiru, live)
生ける (ikeru, enliven)
伸びる (nobiru, extend; intransitive)
伸べる (noberu, extend; transitive)
得る (eru, get)
経る (heru, pass)
教える (oshieru, teach)
交える (majieru, mix)
憂える (ureeru, grieve)
和える (aeru, dress (food))
終える (oeru, finalize)
消える (kieru, vanish)
当てる (ateru, hit)
出る (deru, exit)
愛でる (mederu, love)
寝る (neru, sleep)
真似る (maneru, imitate)
兼ねる (kaneru, combine)
受ける (ukeru, receive)
Pseudo-nidan verbs
強う (shiu/shū, coerce)	強うる (shiuru/shūru, coercing)	
悔ゆ (kuyu, regret)	悔ゆる (kuyuru, regretting)	
落つ (otsu, fall)	落つる (otsuru, falling)	
閉ず (tozu, close)	閉ずる (tozuru, closing)	
生く (iku, live / enliven)	生くる (ikuru, living / enlivening)	
伸ぶ (nobu, extend)	伸ぶる (noburu, extending)	
得 (u, get) (Note: Often used in ariu beki (有り得べき; 'possible').)	得る (uru, getting) (Note: Now used idiomatically attributively as a stylistic variant of eru after infinitives to convey potentiality, for example in kakieru/‑uru (書き得る; 'can write'). Arieru/‑uru (有り得る; 'possible') is an oft-used idiomatic attributive.)	
経 (fu, pass)	経る (furu, passing)	
教う (oshiu/oshū, teach)	教うる (oshiuru/oshūru, teaching)	
交う (majiu/majū, mix)	交うる (majiuru/majūru, mixing)	
憂う (ureu/uryō, grieve)	憂うる (ureuru/uryōru, grieving)	
和う (au/ō, dress (food))	和うる (auru/ōru, (food-)dressing)	
終う (ou/ō, finalize)	終うる (ouru/ōru, finalizing)	
消ゆ (kiyu, vanish)	消ゆる (kiyuru, vanishing)	
当つ (atsu, hit)	当つる (atsuru, hitting)	
出 (zu, exit)	出る (zuru, exiting)	
愛ず (mezu, love)	愛ずる (mezuru, loving)	
寝 (nu, sleep)	寝る (nuru, sleeping)	
真似 (manu, imitate)	真似る (manuru, imitating)	
兼ぬ (kanu, combine)	兼ぬる (kanuru, combining)	
受く (uku, receive)	受くる (ukuru, receiving)	
Irregular verbs
する (suru, do)
す (su, do)	する (suru, doing)	
勉強する (benkyō suru, study)
勉強す (benkyō su, study)	勉強する (benkyō suru, studying)	
愛する (aisuru, love)		愛す (aisu)
愛す (aisu, love)	愛する (aisuru, loving)	愛す (aisu)
達する (tassuru, reach)		達す・達しる (tassu/tasshiru)
達す (tassu, reach)	達する (tassuru, reaching)	達す・達しる (tassu/tasshiru)
察する (sassuru, guess)		察しる (sasshiru, guess)
察す (sassu, guess)	察する (sassuru, guessing)	察しる (sasshiru, guess)
信ずる (shinzuru, believe)		信じる (shinjiru)
信ず (shinzu, believe)	信ずる (shinzuru, believing)	信じる (shinjiru)
進ずる (shinzuru, give)		進ぜる・進じる (shinzeru/shinjiru)
進ず (shinzu, give)	進ずる (shinzuru, giving)	進ぜる・進じる (shinzeru/shinjiru)
来る (kuru, come)
来 (ku, come)	来る (kuru, coming)	
出来 (deku, come into existence / be possible)	出来る (dekuru, coming into existence / being possible)	
有り (ari, exist)	有る (aru, existing)	
死ぬ (shinu, die)	死ぬる (shinuru, dying)	
Verbal auxiliaries
〜(ら)れる (‑(ra)reru) (Note: See Japanese conjugation (mizenkei base)#Passive.)
〜(ら)る (‑(ra)ru)	〜(ら)るる (‑(ra)ruru)	
〜(さ)せる・〜(さ)す (‑(sa)seru/‑(sa)su) (Note: See Japanese conjugation (mizenkei base)#Causative.)
〜(さ)す (‑(sa)su)	〜(さ)する (‑(sa)suru)	
〜しめる (‑shimeru)
〜しむ (‑shimu)	〜しむる (‑shimuru)	
〜ます(る) (‑masu(ru))
〜た・〜だ (‑ta/‑da) (Note: See #Perfective.)	〜た(る)・〜だ(る) (‑ta(ru)/‑da(ru))	
Adjectives and adjectival auxiliaries
無い (nai, be nonexistent)
無し (nashi, be nonexistent)	無き (naki, being nonexistent)	
無し (nashi, be nonexistent)	無かる (nakaru, being nonexistent)	
良い (ii/yoi, be good)
良し (yoshi, be good)	良き (yoki, being good)	
良し (yoshi, be good)	良かる (yokaru, being good)	
宜しい (yoroshii, be good)
宜し (yoroshi, be good)	宜しき (yoroshiki, being good)	
宜し (yoroshi, be good)	宜しかる (yoroshikaru, being good)	
同じい (onajii, be alike)
同じ (onaji, be alike)	同じき (onajiki, being alike)	
同じ (onaji, be alike)	同じかる (onajikaru, being alike)	
可し (beshi, ought/have to)	可き (beki, having to)	
可し (beshi, ought/have to)	可かる (bekaru, having to)	
可い (bei, let's/probably)
如し (gotoshi, be like)	如き (gotoki, being like)	
如し (gotoshi, be like)	如かる (gotokaru, being like)	
まい (mai, let's/probably not)
まじ (maji, ought/have not to)	まじき (majiki, having not to)	
まじ (maji, ought/have not to)	まじかる (majikaru, having not to)	
まじい (majii, ought/have not to)
Special auxiliaries
〜ん・〜ぬ (‑n(u), not)
〜ず (‑zu, without)	〜ざる (‑zaru, without)	

== Grammatical compatibility ==
The imperfective conclusive/attributive form can be followed by various extenders.

Imperfective conclusive/attributive with extender
Extender	English	Japanese	Function
to (と)	When it's late March, cherry blossoms start to bloom.	Sangatsu no kōhan ni naru to, sakura ga sakihajimemasu. (３月の後半になると、桜が咲き始めます。)	matter-of-fact (factual, habitual, procedural, etc.) condition
to (と)	Every morning when I wake up, I drink a cup of black tea.	Maiasa okiru to, kōcha o ippai nomimasu. (毎朝起きると、紅茶を１杯飲みます。)	matter-of-fact (factual, habitual, procedural, etc.) condition
to (と)	If/When you put money in and press this button, a ticket comes out.	Okane o irete botan o osu to, kippu ga dete kimasu. (お金を入れてボタンを押すと、切符が出てきます。)	matter-of-fact (factual, habitual, procedural, etc.) condition
na (な)	Don't be mad.	Sō okoru na yo (そう怒るなよ)	plain negative command
na (な)	Being told not to look just makes you want to see even more.	Miru na to iwareru to yokei mitaku naru mono da (見るなと言われると余計見たくなるものだ)	quoted negative command
nakare (なかれ)	Never speak ill of others.	Hito o hibō suru nakare (人を誹謗するなかれ)	same as na; more elevated
mai (まい) (Note: Equivalent to ‑nai darō/deshō, ‑masen deshō, among others.)	If this keeps up, it probably won't rain today.	Kono bun nara kyō wa furu mai (この分なら今日は降るまい)	negative tentative
mai (まい)	I'd rather not tell you the rest.	Sono saki wa mā hanashimasu mai (その先はまあ話しますまい)	negative hortative
mai (まい)	Whether I go or not is up to me.	Ikō to iku mai to ore no katte da (行こうと行くまいと俺の勝手だ)	negative hortative
majiki (まじき)	impermissible discriminatory conduct	yurusu majiki sabetsu kōi (許すまじき差別行為)	that something ought not to, is not supposed to, must necessarily not, or is impossible to happen
majiki (まじき)	Such conduct is unbecoming to a student. (Note: Or, "It's conduct that shouldn't be for a student.")	Gakusei ni aru majiki kōi da (学生にあるまじき行為だ)	that something ought not to, is not supposed to, must necessarily not, or is impossible to happen
beshi (べし)	It must be a mistake.	Ayamari naru beshi (誤りなるべし)	that something ought to, is supposed to, has necessarily to, or is possible to happen
beshi (べし)	Folks like those will surely go to hell.	Sayō no monodomo wa jigoku ni otsu beshi (さようの者どもは地獄に堕つべし)	that something ought to, is supposed to, has necessarily to, or is possible to happen
beshi (べし)	a job that must be done	yaru beki shigoto (やるべき仕事)	that something ought to, is supposed to, has necessarily to, or is possible to happen
beshi (べし)	I saw all I needed to see.	Miru beki mono wa mita (見るべきものは見た)	that something ought to, is supposed to, has necessarily to, or is possible to happen
beshi (べし)	available heat	riyō shiu beki netsuryō (利用し得べき熱量)	that something ought to, is supposed to, has necessarily to, or is possible to happen
beshi (べし)	Word of its development had been passed from mouth to mouth, casting a gloom over the otherwise joyous family supper.	Shokei no moyō wa kuchi kara kuchi e to tsutaerare, tanoshikaru beki kazoku no shokutaku o kuraku shite ita. (処刑の模様は口から口へと伝えられ、楽しかるべき家族の食卓を暗くしていた。)	that something ought to, is supposed to, has necessarily to, or is possible to happen
beshi (べし)	[...] Nicholas, who [...] had spent that otherwise joyful day in inactivity, felt as though his chest tightened even more.	[...] kono tanoshikaru beki hi o mui no uchi ni sugoshite shimatta Nikorai no mune wa, nao issō shimetsukerareru yō na omoi ga shita. ([...]この楽しかるべき日を無為のうちにすごしてしまったニコライの胸は、なお一層締めつけられるような思いがした。)	that something ought to, is supposed to, has necessarily to, or is possible to happen
beshi (べし)	Children ought to care for their parents.	Kodomo wa oya o taisetsu ni su(ru) beki da (子供は親を大切にす(る)べきだ)	that something ought to, is supposed to, has necessarily to, or is possible to happen
beshi (べし)	You should teach your children what's wrong is wrong.	Kodomo ni wa warui koto wa warui to oshieru beki da (子供には悪いことは悪いと教えるべきだ)	that something ought to, is supposed to, has necessarily to, or is possible to happen
beshi (べし)	“To be, or not to be, that is the question. [...]”	“Aru beki ka, nakaru beki ka, sore ga mondai da. [...]” (「在るべきか、なかるべきか、それが問題だ。[...]」)	that something ought to, is supposed to, has necessarily to, or is possible to happen
beshi (べし)	The party started the preparation necessary to take back power in the next election.	Sono tō wa tsugi no senkyo de seiken o dakkan su(ru) beku junbi o kaishi shita (その党は次の選挙で政権を奪還す(る)べく準備を開始した)	that something ought to, is supposed to, has necessarily to, or is possible to happen
beshi (べし)	Do this, if possible!	Nashiu beku wa kore o nase (為し得べくはこれを為せ)	that something ought to, is supposed to, has necessarily to, or is possible to happen
beshi (べし)	Get in touch as soon as possible.	Naru beku hayaku renraku shite kure (なるべく早く連絡してくれ)	that something ought to, is supposed to, has necessarily to, or is possible to happen
bekarazu (べからず)	No smoking on school premises	Kōnai ni te kitsuen su bekarazu (校内にて喫煙すべからず)	that something ought not to, is not supposed to, must necessarily not, or is impossible to happen
bekarazu (べからず)	A word against his action was called for. (Note: Or, "There must not be no word (=there must be a word) against his action.")	Kare no kōdō hitokoto nakaru bekarazu de atta (彼の行動に対して一言なかるべからずであった)	that something ought not to, is not supposed to, must necessarily not, or is impossible to happen
bekarazu (べからず)	Yoshitsura was known as Sahara Jūrō, with an imposing stature, brains and brawn, and far too many exploits to count, [...] (Note: Or, "it's impossible to count his exploits.")	Yoshitsura wa iwayuru Sahara Jūrō de, yōbō kaii, tanryaku ari, senkō agete kazō bekarazu, [...] (義連はいわゆる佐原十郞で、容貌魁偉、膽略あり、戦功挙げて数うべからず、[...])	that something ought not to, is not supposed to, must necessarily not, or is impossible to happen
bekarazu (べからず)	the don'ts (Note: Or, "the list of what not to do")	bekarazu shū (べからず集)	that something ought not to, is not supposed to, must necessarily not, or is impossible to happen
bekarazu (べからず)	There are things beyond human comprehension. (Note: Or, "There are things inexplicable by human knowledge.")	Jinchi ni rikai shiu bekarazaru koto ga aru (人智に理解し得べからざることがある)	that something ought not to, is not supposed to, must necessarily not, or is impossible to happen
bekarazu (べからず)	an unpardonable crime	yurusu bekarazaru hanzai (許すべからざる犯罪)	that something ought not to, is not supposed to, must necessarily not, or is impossible to happen

== See also ==
- Japanese conjugation
- Japanese godan and ichidan verbs
- Honorific speech in Japanese
- Japanese adjectives
- Japanese particles
- Japanese grammar

== Bibliography ==
- Akimoto, Morihide (1 March 2001). Yamaguchi, Akiho; Akimoto, Morihide (eds.). 日本語文法大辞典 (in Japanese). Chiyoda, Tokyo: Meiji Shoin. pp. 709–710, 712–714, 742–743, 822–823, 871. ISBN 4-625-40300-6.
- Banno, Eri; Ikeda, Yōko; Ohno, Yutaka; Shinagawa, Chikako; Tokashiki, Kyōko (5 March 2020a) [20 May 1999]. GENKI: An Integrated Course in Elementary Japanese Ⅰ (3rd ed.). Chiyoda, Tokyo: The Japan Times Publishing. ISBN 978-4-7890-1730-5.
- Banno, Eri; Ikeda, Yōko; Ohno, Yutaka; Shinagawa, Chikako; Tokashiki, Kyōko (5 October 2020b) [20 October 1999]. GENKI: An Integrated Course in Elementary Japanese Ⅱ (3rd ed.). Chiyoda, Tokyo: The Japan Times Publishing. ISBN 978-4-7890-1732-9.
- Frellesvig, Bjarke (2010). A History of the Japanese Language. New York: Cambridge University Press. ISBN 978-0-521-65320-6.
- Fujii, Toshihiro (1 March 2001). Yamaguchi, Akiho; Akimoto, Morihide (eds.). 日本語文法大辞典 (in Japanese). Chiyoda, Tokyo: Meiji Shoin. pp. 38–39, 58–59, 100–101. ISBN 4-625-40300-6.
- Henderson, Harold Gould (1948) [1943]. Handbook of Japanese Grammar (revised ed.). Cambridge, Massachusetts: The Riverside Press.
- Iori, Isao; Takanashi, Shino; Nakanishi, Kumiko; Yamada, Toshihiro (15 November 2018). Matsuoka, Hiroshi (ed.). 初(しょ)級(きゅう)を教(おし)える人(ひと)のための日(に)本(ほん)文(ぶん)法(ぽう)ハンドブック (in Japanese). Chiyoda, Tokyo: 3A Corporation.
- Itoi, Michihiro (1 March 2001). Yamaguchi, Akiho; Akimoto, Morihide (eds.). 日本語文法大辞典 (in Japanese). Chiyoda, Tokyo: Meiji Shoin. pp. 614–617, 821–822. ISBN 4-625-40300-6.
- Kaiser, Stefan; Ichikawa, Yasuko; Kobayashi, Noriko; Yamamoto, Hilofumi (2013) [2001]. Japanese: A Comprehensive Grammar. Routledge Comprehensive Grammars (2nd ed.). Milton Park, Abingdon, Oxfordshire, Oxford; New York: Routledge. ISBN 978-0-203-08519-6.
- Kimura, Masanori (1 March 2001). しる （知る）. In Yamaguchi, Akiho; Akimoto, Morihide (eds.). 日本語文法大辞典 (in Japanese). Chiyoda, Tokyo: Meiji Shoin. pp. 353–354. ISBN 4-625-40300-6.
- Komatsu, Kōzō (1 March 2001). Yamaguchi, Akiho; Akimoto, Morihide (eds.). 日本語文法大辞典 (in Japanese). Chiyoda, Tokyo: Meiji Shoin. pp. 67–68, 161–162. ISBN 4-625-40300-6.
- Kubota, Atsushi (1 March 2001). Yamaguchi, Akiho; Akimoto, Morihide (eds.). 日本語文法大辞典 (in Japanese). Chiyoda, Tokyo: Meiji Shoin. pp. 32–33, 747. ISBN 4-625-40300-6.
- Koyanagi, Tomokazu (March 2014). 中央語における動詞活用の歴史 (PDF). 全国方言文法辞典資料集 (in Japanese). 2. 方言文法研究会: 20–29. NCID: BB1529267X. Archived (PDF) from the original on 20 October 2018.
- Kuno, Susumu (1973). The Structure of the Japanese Language. Cambridge, Massachusetts; London, England: MIT Press. ISBN 0-262-11049-0.
- Kuno, Susumu (1 April 1983). 新日本文法研究 (in Japanese). Chiyoda, Tokyo: Taishukan Publishing.
- Lammers, Wayne P. (2005). Japanese the Manga Way: An Illustrated Guide to Grammar and Structure (in English and Japanese). Berkeley, California: Stone Bridge Press. ISBN 978-1-880656-90-7.
- Makino, Seiichi; Tsutsui, Michio (20 May 2018) [20 March 1986]. A Dictionary of Basic Japanese Grammar 日本語基本文法辞典 (77th ed.). Minato, Tokyo: The Japan Times. ISBN 978-4-7890-0454-1.
- Martin, Samuel Elmo (2004) [1975]. A Reference Grammar of Japanese (revised ed.). Honolulu: University of Hawai'i Press. ISBN 0-8248-2818-6.
- Matsuoka McClain, Yoko (1986) [1981]. Handbook of Modern Japanese Grammar: including Lists of Words and Expressions with English Equivalents for Reading Aid 口語日本文法便覧（日本語特殊表現とその英語相当訳及び例題付）. Chiyoda, Tokyo: The Hokuseido Press. ISBN 4-590-00570-0.
- Ministry of Education, Science, Sports and Culture (15 September 1935a). 口語法別記 (in Japanese) (3rd ed.). Kyōbashi, Tokyo: Dainippon Tosho.
- Miura, Akira (2011). Essential Japanese Vocabulary: Learn to Avoid Common (and Embarrassing!) Mistakes. Tuttle Publishing. ISBN 978-4-8053-1127-1.
- Miyake, Toshihiro (1 April 2016). 可能動詞の成立. 日本語の研究 (in Japanese). 12 (2): 1–17. doi:10.20666/nihongonokenkyu.12.2_1. Archived from the original on 20 November 2017.
- Nakamura, Masayuki (31 March 2009). 日本語動詞の音便について (PDF). Kotonoha (in Japanese) (76). Japan: 古代文字資料館: 1–3. Archived (PDF) from the original on 19 August 2019.
- Nakano, Kotoyo (September 2008). "Japanese potential verb" 日本語の可能動詞 (PDF). 下関市立大学論集 (in Japanese). 52 (1–2). 下関市立大学学会: 103–114. ISSN 0387-5296. OCLC 183202722. SC20052000109. Archived (PDF) from the original on 26 January 2021.
- Shibuya, Katsumi (March 2002). Ōnishi, Takuichirō (ed.). 方言文法調査ガイドブック (PDF) (in Japanese). Kita, Tokyo: National Institute for Japanese Language and Linguistics.
- Poser, William John (23 November 1984). The Phonetics and Phonology of Tone and Intonation in Japanese (PDF) (doctoral thesis). Massachusetts Institute of Technology.
- Rubin, Jay (January 2004) [January 2002]. Making Sense of Japanese: What the Textbooks Don’t Tell You 日(に)本(ほん)語(ご)の秘(ひ)訣(けつ) (3rd ed.). Kodansha International. ISBN 4-7700-2802-4.
- Sakaki, Mika (17 January 2019). 動詞の音便の方言学的研究―サ行イ音便を中心として― (doctoral thesis) (in Japanese). Tohoku University. Archived from the original on 28 June 2021.
- Shirane, Haruo (2005). Classical Japanese: A Grammar. New York: Columbia University Press. ISBN 978-0-231-13524-5.
- Suzuki, Hideo (1 March 2001). Yamaguchi, Akiho; Akimoto, Morihide (eds.). 日本語文法大辞典 (in Japanese). Chiyoda, Tokyo: Meiji Shoin. pp. 336, 359–360, 598–599, 745–747, 843–844. ISBN 4-625-40300-6.
- Yada, Tsutomu (1 March 2001). Yamaguchi, Akiho; Akimoto, Morihide (eds.). 日本語文法大辞典 (in Japanese). Chiyoda, Tokyo: Meiji Shoin. pp. 209–210, 216. ISBN 4-625-40300-6.
- Yamaguchi, Akiho (1 March 2001). Yamaguchi, Akiho; Akimoto, Morihide (eds.). 日本語文法大辞典 (in Japanese). Chiyoda, Tokyo: Meiji Shoin. pp. 63–64, 162–163, 424–425, 502, 508–509, 728, 777, 822, 853. ISBN 4-625-40300-6.
- Yamauchi, Keisuke (1 March 2001). なさる（為さる）. In Yamaguchi, Akiho; Akimoto, Morihide (eds.). 日本語文法大辞典 (in Japanese). Chiyoda, Tokyo: Meiji Shoin. pp. 557–558. ISBN 4-625-40300-6.
