= Japanese negative form conjugation (mizenkei base) =

Japanese conjugation, like the conjugation of verbs of many other languages, allows verbs to be morphologically modified to change their meaning or grammatical function. In Japanese, the beginning of a word (the stem) is preserved during conjugation, while the ending of the word is altered in some way to change the meaning (this is the inflectional suffix). Japanese verb conjugations are independent of person, number and gender (they do not depend on whether the subject is I, you, he, she, we, etc.); the conjugated forms can express meanings such as negation, present and past tense, volition, passive voice, causation, imperative and conditional mood, and ability. There are also special forms for conjunction with other verbs, and for combination with particles for additional meanings.

Japanese verbs have agglutinating properties: some of the conjugated forms are themselves conjugable verbs (or i-adjectives), which can result in several suffixes being strung together in a single verb form to express a combination of meanings.

A revision sheet visually summarizing the conjugations and uses described below

Conjugable words (verbs, i‑adjectives, and na‑adjectives) are traditionally considered to have six possible conjugational stems or bases (活用形, katsuyōkei; literally "conjugation forms"). This article lists those from the negative base (未然形, mizenkei), as well as the tentative base (推量形/意思形, suiryōkei/ishikei) that was split off during the post‑WWII spelling reforms.

The negative (否定形・打消形, hiteikei/uchikeishikei), apart from being plainly negative, can commonly express affirmation of the contrary but in an understated way, for example in rhetorical negative questions which imply affirmation, often for politeness, such as for softening hortatives.

== Negative form example sentences ==
Negative form example sentences
| English | Japanese | Function |
|---|---|---|
| 'There's no need to lose your temper with me,' […] 'If you're upset because Isobel went back to London, then that's not my fault! She could have stayed here overnight. It's not as though Joseph is around to be offended. In fact, I'm sure that Joseph wouldn't have been offended anyway.' | "Watashi ni atari chirasu hitsuyō wa nai deshō" […] "Izaberu ga Rondon ni modotta kara kigen ga warui no da to shite mo, watashi no tsumi ja nai wa! Kanojo ni tomatte moraeba yokatta no ni. Tomatte mo Jozefu wa ki ni shinai wa" (「わたしに当たり散らす必要はないでしょう」[…]「イザベルがロンドンに戻ったから機嫌が悪いのだとしても、わたしの罪じゃないわ！ 彼女に泊まってもらえばよかったのに。泊まってもジョゼフは気にしないわ」) | general negation |
| After all, she'd seen the old lady every day. He'd stayed away for six years. (Note: He'd never come once for the past six years.) | Fiona wa mainichi Goruda ni atte ita ga, kono rokunenkan, kare wa ichido mo ai ni konakatta. (フィオナは毎日ゴルダに会っていたが、この六年間、彼は一度も会いに来なかった。) | general negation |
| "He hasn't nerve enough to kill a fly." | "Kare ni hae mo korosenakarō" (「彼には蠅も殺せなかろう」) | general negation |
| You cannot pass! Gandalf! I am a servant of the Secret Fire, wielder of the flame of Anor. The dark fire will not avail you, flame of Udûn! Go back to the Shadow. You shall not pass! | Kono saki wa tōsan! Gandarufu! Ware wa Shinpi no Hi ni tsukaeru mono, Anōru no honō no tsukaite ja. Kisama no hanatsu hi wa, washi ni wa tsūjin! Yami no soko ni modoru ga yoi. Koko wa danjite tōsan! (この先は通さん！ ガンダルフ！ 我は神秘の火に仕える者、アノールの炎の使い手じゃ。貴様の放つ火は、儂には通じん！闇の底に戻るがよい。ここは断じて通さん！) | general negation |
| Die for me, thou shalt not. And I too shall not die for thee. | Kisama wa kono washi no tame ni shini wa senu. Washi mo kisama no kawari ni wa shinanu. (貴様はこのわしのために死にはせぬ。わしも貴様の代りには死なぬ。) | general negation |
| Thanks to that, I did not die. | “Sono okage de watakushi wa shinananda no desu ne” (「其お蔭で私は死ななんだのですネ」) | general negation |
| Even so, he never lost hope. | Sore de mo kesshite nozomi o ushinaimasen deshita. (それでも決して望みを失いませんでした。) | general negation |
| Did you walk round the city streets in America? I didn't. (Note: Rather than arukimasen deshita.) | Amerika de machi no naka o oaruki ni narimashita ka Arukimasen (アメリカで街の中をお歩きになりましたか 歩きません) | past negation in non‑past form |
| I stayed up late at night waiting, but he never came. (Note: Rather than konakatta.) | Yoru, osoku made matte 'ta kedo, konai n da (夜、遅くまで待ってたけど、来ないんだ) | past negation in non‑past form |
| Isn't the magazine interesting and doesn't it also prove of value? | Kono zasshi wa omoshiroku mo ari, tame ni mo nari wa shinai ka (この雑誌は面白くもあり、ためにもなりはしないか) | rhetorically implied affirmation of the contrary |
| Won't you read it? (Note: Won't you read it? → Would you be kind enough to read it?) | Yomimasen ka (読みませんか) | rhetorically implied affirmation of the contrary |
| Aren't we early? (Note: Aren't we early? → We are surely early, aren't we?) | Hayai ja nai ka (早いじゃないか) | rhetorically implied affirmation of the contrary |
| Aren't we not early? (Note: Are we not not early → We are surely not early, are we?) | Hayaku nai ja nai ka (早くないじゃないか) | rhetorically implied affirmation of the contrary |
| Isn't it nice? (Note: Isn't it nice? → It is surely nice, isn't it?) | Ii ja nai no (いいじゃないの) | rhetorically implied affirmation of the contrary |
| He said he'd come but I guess he won't after all. (Note: Isn't it that he won't come? → He won't come, will he?) | Kuru to itta no ni konai ja arimasen ka (来ると言ったのに来ないじゃありませんか) | rhetorically implied affirmation of the contrary |
| Shall we leave? (Note: Isn't it that we will leave? → Shan't we leave? → Shall we leave?) | Kaerō ja arimasen ka (帰ろうじゃありませんか) | rhetorically implied affirmation of the contrary |
| How about a drink? (Note: Isn't it that you'll drink a cup? → Won't you have a drink? → Will you have a drink?) | Ippai nomō ja nai ka (一杯飲もうじゃないか) | rhetorically implied affirmation of the contrary |
| Of course not only is there lack of evidence to substantiate the government's theory but on the contrary a number of pieces of counter‑evidence even can be offered. | Mochiron seifusetsu o urazukeru kakushō wa ima no tokoro nai bakari ka, gyaku ni ikutsu ka no hanshō mo ageru koto ga dekiru (もちろん政府説を裏付ける確証は今のところないばかりか、逆にいくつかの反証も上げることができる) | rhetorically implied affirmation of the contrary |
| My grades were none too outstanding. | Seiseki wa yūshū na hō de wa nakatta (成績は優秀なほうではなかった) | rhetorically implied affirmation of the contrary |
| There is no reason to think that a mouse can get the better of a cat. | Nezumi ga neko ni kateru hazu ga nai (ネズミが猫に勝てるはずがない) | rhetorically implied affirmation of the contrary |

== Negative: Conjugation table ==
The negative form is created by using the mizenkei base, followed by the ‑nai (ない) suffix. This auxiliary arose in eastern dialects during Late Middle Japanese and displaced the western ‑n (see below) in standard Japanese, and while having been linked to another negative auxiliary, ‑nau → ‑nō (なふ), it appears to be a grammaticalized version of the adjective nai (無い; 'be nonexistent'). In masculine (or rural eastern) speech, ‑nai is smoothed out into ‑nē (see Japanese conjugation (imperfective form) § Conjugation table for more comparative examples).

‑N (karan (狩らん; 'not hunt')) is a negative auxiliary that was reduced from the earlier western and classical ‑nu (karanu (狩らぬ)), but was largely displaced by the eastern ‑nai (karanai (狩らない)) in standard Japanese. ‑N(u) is still found in modern Japanese and thought of as "shortened" from ‑nai, although as the fact that shin(u) (しん・しぬ) is strictly dialectal compared to the standard sen(u) (せん・せぬ) shows, it is not really a "short" form. Some modern examples include tokoro ga, henji o yokosan no desu (ところが、返事を寄越さんのです; 'but they sent me no reply'), Boku wa benkai sen desu. Tada iwan koto o kakaretara komaru. (僕は弁解せんです。ただ言わん事を書かれたら困る; 'I don't make excuses. It's just that it is embarrassing to have things written as if I had said them when I haven't.'), sen de kudasai (せんでください; 'don't do it'). ‑N(u)'s infinitive form, ‑zu, is still used in writing. Ja nai (no) ka (じゃない(の)か; 'isn't it?') is indeed shortened to jan (じゃん) especially by young people. ‑Nai and ‑nu can be used in the same sentence where ‑nai is treated as conclusive and ‑nu as attributive: Gaikōken o motanu Okinawa wa Amerika to kōshō suru koto mo dekinai (外交権を持たぬ沖縄はアメリカと交渉することもできない; 'Okinawa, which does not have diplomatic power, cannot negotiate with America').

The regular negative of aru would be aranai, but it is very rarely used, for example in Honma ni uso de wa aranai to yū no ja na (本間に嘘ではあらないというのじゃな), Tosa to te oni no kuni de mo hebi no kuni de mo aranai mono o (土佐とて鬼の国でも蛇の国でもあらないものを), etc. In Murakami Haruki's 2017 novel Killing Commendatore, the character "Commendatore", who is characterized as having "an odd way of speaking" that is "not the way ordinary people would speak", often, but not always, uses aranai in place of nai. The western aranu usually functions as an attributive word that idiomatically means "unexpected" or "untoward", as in aranu koto o kuchibashiru (あらぬことを口走る; 'blurt something out out of left field'); it can still have a literal meaning and be used predicatively just like nai, but for literary or faux‑archaic effect, as in the Parmenidian phrase aru mono wa ari, aranu mono wa aranu (あるものはあり、あらぬものはあらぬ; transl. that which is, is, that which is not, is not). Arazu usually occurs in the literary negative copular phrase ni arazu (にあらず), as in taben wa yūben ni arazu (多弁は雄弁にあらず; transl. a wealth of word is not eloquence).

For the negatives of suru and its compounds, the general practice is to pair the eastern shi‑ with the eastern ‑nai, and the western se‑ with the western ‑n(u) and ‑zu for mainstream Japanese (only the eastern shinai is standard). Any of such combinations as sanai, sunai, shin(u), etc are considered dialectal. The writer Mori Ōgai, hailing from the western prefecture of Shimane, reportedly rigorously used senai, apparently in accordance with the classical (western) se‑, despite the dominance of sen in the west. For "irregular" verbs such as aisuru (愛する) and tassuru (達する), which are irregular even compared to suru, see Japanese conjugation § The bases of suru for more.

The current negative of ‑masu is ‑masen. The unique shapes of ‑masen (rather than ‑mashinai) and the hortative ‑mashō (rather than *‑mashiyō) suggest their provenance in western polite speech. Compare westernized hyper‑polite adjectival expressions with gozaimasu. The easternized ‑mashinai was first recorded in its spoken form with vowel fusion as ‑mashinē in Edo Japanese. It has been attested in dialog from modern literature, for example in the speech of underclass, poor, peasant, servile or rural characters, even non‑Japanese ones, notably the eye dialect of black slaves from the novel Gone with the Wind. The practice of using the stigmatized "unsophisticated" Tōhoku Japanese, (Note: Or at least a fictionalized form of it, which has long been associated with eastern rusticity, relatively compared to the more urban eastern capital of Edo.) in which ‑mashinai and ‑mashinē figure, to translate the stereotypical speech of black Southern Americans, has become unpopular. The use of a low‑class pseudo‑dialect has been claimed to contribute to the churlish stereotype of Tōhoku Japanese, although it has also been argued that such use is increasingly perceived as mere fictional rural speech without necessarily any association with real‑life dialects.

The negatives of kuru (来る) are regularly konai/konē/kon(u), with kinai/kinē being dialectal Kantō alternatives.

‑N also happens to be a reduced form of ‑mu (karamu (狩らむ; 'let's hunt; probably hunt')), whose other reduced form, ‑u, is still used to make hortative forms (karō (狩ろう)). ‑Nu also happens to be an archaic perfective auxiliary, with a different conjugation from the negative ‑nu; it is equivalent to ‑ta/‑da in modern Japanese, and it is sometimes used elevatedly, as in Kaze to Tomo ni Sarinu (=Satta) (風と共に去りぬ; 'Gone with the Wind').

The godan and ichidan‑based negative endings ‑ranai, ‑rinai or ‑renai, specifically with the consonant r, can be reduced to ‑nnai and even ‑nnē in speech, as in wakaranai → wakannai (分かんない), naranai → nannē (なんねえ), kurenai → kunnai (呉んない).

The expressions sumanai/suman/sumimasen (すまない・すまん・すみません; 'I'm sorry', lit. 'it isn't over') comes from a special use of the subsidiary verb sumu (済む; 'be over') (see Gerund: Grammatical compatibility for examples).

The godan verb shiru (知る), whose kanji represents the Chinese word for "know", is often translated as "know", but a more accurate translation would be "learn", "find out", or "get to know". In order to say "I know", the construction shitte( i)ru (知って(い)る) is used instead (see Gerund: Grammatical compatibility for the usage of ‑te iru). This is because shiru is imbued with active recognition, which relates to the archaic meaning of taking physical command or possession of somebody or something, reflected by the spellings 治る with the kanji for the Chinese word for "rule", "govern" or "control", and 領る for "lead". To "know", therefore, is to take psychological command or possession of outside information, hence shiru ("I take command of this information"), and maintain it, hence shitte iru ("I took command of this information and it's still in my knowledge"). While "I know" ("I take command of it and still have it") is shitte iru, "I don't know" is actually shiranai (知らない; "I don't take command of it"), which is morphologically the negative of shiru, but semantically the negative of both shitte iru and shiru.

On the other hand, shitte inai (知っていない; "I didn't take command of it and still don't have it") implies perpetuation of ignorance, for example in Ningen ga naze hito o korosu no ka […] sono konponteki na riyū ni tsuite, watashitachi wa mada nani mo shitte inai, to omowareru kara de aru (人間がなぜ人を殺すか[…]その根本的な理由について、私たちはまだ何も知っていない、と思われるからである; transl. Why does a human being kill another person? […] it seems that we still remain ignorant of the basic reasons for that). There have been analyses on precise cases where shitte inai is interchangeable with or even preferable to shiranai, for example when paired with shitte iru in the same clause, as in Doitsu-go o shitte ite mo shiranakute mo / shitte inakute mo saiyō shiken ni wa kankei nai. (ドイツ語を知っていても知らなくても・知っていなくても採用試験には関係ない。; transl. Whether you know German or not has nothing to do with the employment test.); or in cases involving the perfect aspect, only shitte inai, not shiranai, can be used, as in Shinbun o yomu made ni, Tarō wa jiken no shinsō o shitte inai. (新聞を読むまでに、太郎は事件の真相を知っていない。; transl. By the time he reads the newspaper, Tarō won't have learnt of the incident.), Tarō wa ima made ichido mo jibun no genkai o shitte inai. (太郎は今まで一度も自分の限界を知っていない。; transl. Tarō hasn't learnt of his own limitations, even once until now.) Nevertheless, the question remains as to why shiranai is uniquely more common than shitte inai as the negative of shitte iru to begin with, a phenomenon not yet observable in other verbs. A recorded conversation with a young child shows that shiranai is not inherently intuitive in and of itself: when his father asked him a question with papa […] shiranai ("I don't know […]"), he mirrored his prompt with shiranai ("I don't know"); yet, when his father asked him with shitte 'ru deshō ("you know, don't you?"), he erroneously responded with *shitte 'ru nai ("I don't know", or more "accurately", shitte 'nai, though the expected response was still shiranai). In western dialects, there are shitte oru → shittoru (知っておる→知っとる; ≈ shitte iru → shitte 'ru), shitte oran → shittoran (知っておらん→知っとらん; ≈ shitte inai → shitte 'nai), shitte oranu → shittoranu (知っておらぬ→知っとらぬ), and shiran (知らん; ≈ shiranai).

Unlike verbs, adjectives do not have mizenkei, and instead their negatives are formed with their infinitives followed by the negative adjective nai, which is used to expand adjectives' negative conjugation similarly to how its opposite, the verb aru, is used to expand their affirmative conjugation. Since nai is of itself an adjective, it is possible to have a double negative, as in shizuka ja naku nai n da ga (静かじゃなくないんだが; transl. it's not not (=it is) quiet all right, but), hanashitaku naku nai kedo (話したくなくないけど; transl. I don't not want (=I do want) to talk, but), ippan no dokusha ni totte tashō wakarinikui ten mo naku wa nai (一般の読者に取って多少分かりにくい点もなくはない; transl. there are not not (=there are) points that, for the general reader, are hard to understand), etc.

The western negative auxiliaries ‑n(u) and ‑zu cannot attach directly to adjectival infinitives, and thus require the help of aru (which does have a mizenkei, ara‑), hence ‑karan(u) (← ‑ku aran(u)), ‑karazu (← ‑ku arazu), ‑karazaru (← ‑ku arazaru), etc. These are primarily used in writing, seldom in speech.

The word keshikaran(u) (怪しからん・怪しからぬ; 'insolent') is the negative of the archaic adjective keshi (怪し; 'unusual'; the modern form would be *keshii). Usually this western negative is used, but the easternized keshikaranai → keshikaranē (怪しからない; rather than *keshiku nai/nē) has also been reported as an Edo expression.

| Dictionary form | Pattern | | | Negative form |
Godan and pseudo‑yodan verbs
| 結う (yuu/yū, fasten) | 結う | 結わ | ない ん ぬ ず | 結わない (yuwanai, not fasten) 結わん (yuwan) 結わぬ (yuwanu) 結わず (yuwazu) |
| 言(い)う (yū, say) | ゆう | いわ ゆわ | ない ん ぬ ず | 言わない (iwanai/yuwanai, not say) 言わん (iwan/yuwan) 言わぬ (iwanu/yuwanu) 言わず (iwazu/yuwazu) |
| 勝つ (katsu, win) | 勝つ | 勝た | ない ん ぬ ず | 勝たない (katanai, not win) 勝たん (katan) 勝たぬ (katanu) 勝たず (katazu) |
| 狩る (karu, hunt) | 狩る | 狩ら | ない ん ぬ ず | 狩らない (karanai, not hunt) 狩らん (karan) 狩らぬ (karanu) 狩らず (karazu) |
| 知る (shiru, find out) | 知る | 知ら | ない ん ぬ ず | 知らない (shiranai, not find out / have not found out) 知らん (shiran) 知らぬ (shiranu) 知らず (shirazu) |
| 貸す (kasu, lend) | 貸す | 貸さ | ない ん ぬ ず | 貸さない (kasanai, not lend) 貸さん (kasan) 貸さぬ (kasanu) 貸さず (kasazu) |
| 愛す (aisu, love) | 愛す | 愛さ | ない ん ぬ ず | 愛さない (aisanai, not love) 愛さん (aisan) 愛さぬ (aisanu) 愛さず (aisazu) |
| 達す (tassu, reach) | 達す | 達さ | ない ん ぬ ず | 達さない (tassanai, not reach) 達さん (tassan) 達さぬ (tassanu) 達さず (tassazu) |
| 書く (kaku, write) | 書く | 書か | ない ん ぬ ず | 書かない (kakanai, not write) 書かん (kakan) 書かぬ (kakanu) 書かず (kakazu) |
| 嗅ぐ (kagu, smell) | 嗅ぐ | 嗅が | ない ん ぬ ず | 嗅がない (kaganai, not smell) 嗅がん (kagan) 嗅がぬ (kaganu) 嗅がず (kagazu) |
| 呼ぶ (yobu, call) | 呼ぶ | 呼ば | ない ん ぬ ず | 呼ばない (yobanai, not call) 呼ばん (yoban) 呼ばぬ (yobanu) 呼ばず (yobazu) |
| 読む (yomu, read) | 読む | 読ま | ない ん ぬ ず | 読まない (yomanai, not read) 読まん (yoman) 読まぬ (yomanu) 読まず (yomazu) |
| 死ぬ (shinu, die) | 死ぬ | 死な | ない ん ぬ ず | 死なない (shinanai, not die) 死なん (shinan) 死なぬ (shinanu) 死なず (shinazu) |
Irregular godan verbs
| 有る (aru, exist) | ある | ない | | 無い (nai, be nonexistent) |
| 有る (aru, exist) | ある | あら | ない ん ぬ ず | 有らない (aranai, not exist) 有らん (aran) 有らぬ (aranu) 有らず (arazu) |
Ichidan verbs
| 見る (miru, look) | 見~~る~~ | 見 | ない ん ぬ ず | 見ない (minai, not look) 見ん (min) 見ぬ (minu) 見ず (mizu) |
| 達しる (tasshiru, reach) | 達し~~る~~ | 達し | ない ん ぬ ず | 達しない (tasshinai, not reach) 達しん (tasshin) 達しぬ (tasshinu) 達しず (tasshizu) |
| 達しる (tasshiru, reach) | 達し~~る~~ | 達せ | ん ぬ ず | 達せん (tassen, not reach) 達せぬ (tassenu) 達せず (tassezu) |
| 察しる (sasshiru, guess) | 察し~~る~~ | 察し | ない ん ぬ ず | 察しない (sasshinai, not guess) 察しん (sasshin) 察しぬ (sasshinu) 察しず (sasshizu) |
| 察しる (sasshiru, guess) | 察し~~る~~ | 察せ | ん ぬ ず | 察せん (sassen, not guess) 察せぬ (sassenu) 察せず (sassezu) |
| 信じる (shinjiru, believe) | 信じ~~る~~ | 信じ | ない ん ぬ ず | 信じない (shinjinai, not believe) 信じん (shinjin) 信じぬ (shinjinu) 信じず (shinjizu) |
| 信じる (shinjiru, believe) | 信じ~~る~~ | 信ぜ | ん ぬ ず | 信ぜん (shinzen, not believe) 信ぜぬ (shinzenu) 信ぜず (shinzezu) |
| 進じる (shinjiru, give) | 進じ~~る~~ | 進じ | ない ん ぬ ず | 進じない (shinjinai, not give) 進じん (shinjin) 進じぬ (shinjinu) 進じず (shinjizu) |
| 進じる (shinjiru, give) | 進じ~~る~~ | 進ぜ | ん ぬ ず | 進ぜん (shinzen, not give) 進ぜぬ (shinzenu) 進ぜず (shinzezu) |
| 進ぜる (shinzeru, give) | 進ぜ~~る~~ | 進ぜ | ない ん ぬ ず | 進ぜない (shinzenai, not give) 進ぜん (shinzen) 進ぜぬ (shinzenu) 進ぜず (shinzezu) |
| 出る (deru, exit) | 出~~る~~ | 出 | ない ん ぬ ず | 出ない (denai, not exit) 出ん (den) 出ぬ (denu) 出ず (dezu) |
Irregular verbs
| する (suru, do) | す~~る~~ | し | ない | しない (shinai, not do) |
| する (suru, do) | す~~る~~ | せ | ん ぬ ず | せん (sen, not do) せぬ (senu) せず (sezu) |
| 勉強する (benkyō suru, study) | 勉強す~~る~~ | 勉強し | ない | 勉強しない (benkyō shinai, not study) |
| 勉強する (benkyō suru, study) | 勉強す~~る~~ | 勉強せ | ん ぬ ず | 勉強せん (benkyō sen, not study) 勉強せぬ (benkyō senu) 勉強せず (benkyō sezu) |
| 愛する (aisuru, love) | 愛す~~る~~ | 愛さ | ない ん ぬ ず | 愛さない (aisanai, not love) 愛さん (aisan) 愛さぬ (aisanu) 愛さず (aisazu) |
| 愛する (aisuru, love) | 愛す~~る~~ | 愛し | ない | 愛しない (aishinai, not love) |
| 愛する (aisuru, love) | 愛す~~る~~ | 愛せ | ん ぬ ず | 愛せん (aisen, not love) 愛せぬ (aisenu) 愛せず (aisezu) |
| 達する (tassuru, reach) | 達す~~る~~ | 達さ 達し | ない ん ぬ ず | 達さない (tassanai, not reach) 達しない (tasshinai) 達さん (tassan) 達しん (tasshin) 達さぬ (tassanu) 達しぬ (tasshinu) 達さず (tassazu) 達しず (tasshizu) |
| 達する (tassuru, reach) | 達す~~る~~ | 達せ | ん ぬ ず | 達せん (tassen, not reach) 達せぬ (tassenu) 達せず (tassezu) |
| 察する (sassuru, guess) | 察す~~る~~ | 察し | ない ん ぬ ず | 察しない (sasshinai, not guess) 察しん (sasshin) 察しぬ (sasshinu) 察しず (sasshizu) |
| 察する (sassuru, guess) | 察す~~る~~ | 察せ | ん ぬ ず | 察せん (sassen, not guess) 察せぬ (sassenu) 察せず (sassezu) |
| 信ずる (shinzuru, believe) | 信ず~~る~~ | 信じ | ない ん ぬ ず | 信じない (shinjinai, not believe) 信じん (shinjin) 信じぬ (shinjinu) 信じず (shinjizu) |
| 信ずる (shinzuru, believe) | 信ず~~る~~ | 信ぜ | ん ぬ ず | 信ぜん (shinzen, not believe) 信ぜぬ (shinzenu) 信ぜず (shinzezu) |
| 進ずる (shinzuru, give) | 進ず~~る~~ | 進じ 進ぜ | ない ん ぬ ず | 進じない (shinjinai, not give) 進ぜない (shinzenai) 進ぜん (shinzen) 進じん (shinjin) 進ぜぬ (shinzenu) 進じぬ (shinjinu) 進ぜず (shinzezu) 進じず (shinjizu) |
| 来る (kuru, come) | く~~る~~ | こ | ない ん ぬ ず | 来ない (konai, not come) 来ん (kon) 来ぬ (konu) 来ず (kozu) |
Verbal auxiliaries
| 〜ます(る) (‑masu(ru)) | ます~~(る)~~ | ませ | ん ぬ ず | 〜ません (‑masen, not) 〜ませぬ (‑masenu) 〜ませず (‑masezu) |
| 〜ます(る) (‑masu(ru)) | ます~~(る)~~ | まし | ない | 〜ましない (‑mashinai, not) |
Adjectives and adjectival auxiliaries
| 〜ない (‑nai, not) | ない | なく のう | ない | 〜なくない (‑naku nai, not not) 〜のうない (‑nō nai) |
| 無い (nai, be nonexistent) 無かる (nakaru) | ない | なく のう | ない | 無くない (naku nai, not be nonexistent → be existent) 無うない (nō nai) |
| 無い (nai, be nonexistent) 無かる (nakaru) | 無かる | 無から | ん ぬ ず | 無からん (nakaran, not be nonexistent → be existent) 無からぬ (nakaranu) 無からず (nakarazu) |
| 少ない (sukunai, be scarce) 少なかる (sukunakaru) | 少ない | 少なく 少のう | ない | 少なくない (sukunaku nai, not be scarce) 少のうない (sukunō nai) |
| 少ない (sukunai, be scarce) 少なかる (sukunakaru) | 少なかる | 少なから | ん ぬ ず | 少なからん (sukunakaran, not be scarce) 少なからぬ (sukunakaranu) 少なからず (sukunakarazu) |
| 弱い (yowai, be weak) 弱かる (yowakaru) | よわい | よわく よおう | ない | 弱くない (yowaku nai, not be weak) 弱うない (yoō nai) |
| 弱い (yowai, be weak) 弱かる (yowakaru) | 弱かる | 弱から | ん ぬ ず | 弱からん (yowakaran, not be weak) 弱からぬ (yowakaranu) 弱からず (yowakarazu) |
| 多い (ōi, be abundant) 多かる (ōkaru) | 多い | 多く 多う | ない | 多くない (ōku nai, not be abundant) 多うない (oō nai) |
| 多い (ōi, be abundant) 多かる (ōkaru) | 多かる | 多から | ん ぬ ず | 多からん (ōkaran, not be abundant) 多からぬ (ōkaranu) 多からず (ōkarazu) |
| 良い (ii/yoi, be good) 良かる (yokaru) | いい よい | よく よう | ない | 良くない (yoku nai, not be good) 良うない (yō nai) |
| 良い (ii/yoi, be good) 良かる (yokaru) | 良かる | 良から | ん ぬ ず | 良からん (yokaran, not be good) 良からぬ (yokaranu) 良からず (yokarazu) |
| 悪い (warui, be bad) 悪かる (warukaru) | 悪い | 悪く 悪う | ない | 悪くない (waruku nai, not be bad) 悪うない (warū nai) |
| 悪い (warui, be bad) 悪かる (warukaru) | 悪かる | 悪から | ん ぬ ず | 悪からん (warukaran, not be bad) 悪からぬ (warukaranu) 悪からず (warukarazu) |
| 可愛い (kawaii/kawayui, be adorable) 可愛かる (kawaikaru/kawayukaru) | かわいい かわゆい | かわいく かわゆく かわゆう | ない | 可愛くない (kawaiku/kawayuku nai, not be adorable) 可愛うない (kawayū nai) |
| 可愛い (kawaii/kawayui, be adorable) 可愛かる (kawaikaru/kawayukaru) | 可愛かる | 可愛から | ん ぬ ず | 可愛からん (kawaikaran/kawayukaran, not be adorable) 可愛からぬ (kawaikaranu/kawayukaranu) 可愛からず (kawaikarazu/kawayukarazu) |
| 大きい (ōkii, be large) 大きかる (ōkikaru) | 大きい | 大きく 大きゅう | ない | 大きくない (ōkiku nai, not be large) 大きゅうない (ōkyū nai) |
| 大きい (ōkii, be large) 大きかる (ōkikaru) | 大きかる | 大きから | ん ぬ ず | 大きからん (ōkikaran, not be large) 大きからぬ (ōkikaranu) 大きからず (ōkikarazu) |
| 宜しい (yoroshii, be good) 宜しかる (yoroshikaru) | 宜しい | 宜しく 宜しゅう | ない | 宜しくない (yoroshiku nai, not be good) 宜しゅうない (yoroshū nai) |
| 宜しい (yoroshii, be good) 宜しかる (yoroshikaru) | 宜しかる | 宜しから | ん ぬ ず | 宜しからん (yoroshikaran, not be good) 宜しからぬ (yoroshikaranu) 宜しからず (yoroshikarazu) |
| 同じい (onajii, be alike) 同じかる (onajikaru) | 同じい | 同じく 同じゅう | ない | 同じくない (onajiku nai, not be alike) 同じゅうない (onajū nai) |
| 同じい (onajii, be alike) 同じかる (onajikaru) | 同じかる | 同じから | ん ぬ ず | 同じからん (onajikaran, not be alike) 同じからぬ (onajikaranu) 同じからず (onajikarazu) |
| 可し (beshi, ought/have to) 可き (beki) 可い (bei) 可かる (bekaru) | べし べき べい | べく びょう | ない | 可くない (beku nai, not have to) 可うない (byō nai) |
| 可し (beshi, ought/have to) 可き (beki) 可い (bei) 可かる (bekaru) | べかる | べから | ん ぬ ず | 可からん (bekaran, not have to) 可からぬ (bekaranu) 可からず (bekarazu) |
| 如し (gotoshi, be like) 如き (gotoki) 如かる (gotokaru) | 如し 如き | 如く | ない | 如くない (gotoku nai, not be like) |
| 如し (gotoshi, be like) 如き (gotoki) 如かる (gotokaru) | 如かる | 如から | ん ぬ ず | 如からん (gotokaran, not be like) 如からぬ (gotokaranu) 如からず (gotokarazu) |

== Negative: Grammatical compatibility ==
The eastern negative ‑nai generally works like an adjective, although its gerund ‑nai de is more common than the adjectival ‑nakute. The western gerund is ‑n(u) de.

The imperfect negative can be followed by the noun uchi (内; 'interval; within'), whereby it means "while it hasn't happened" or "before it happens." Contradictorily, when it is followed by the nouns mae (前; 'front; before') and saki (先; 'tip; first'), it can also mean the same thing, even though the literal meaning would suggest "before it doesn't happen." Thus, konai uchi (来ないうち; 'before one comes') would mean the same as konai mae/saki (来ない前・先), and roughly as the affirmative kuru mae (来る前) which, however, may be used when the speaker has positive conviction that one will in fact come.

The classical, and thus more literary than colloquial, (Note: Except in western speech.) ‑zu is originally the infinitive of ‑n(u), but it is often used conclusively with a copula. It is often optionally followed by the copular infinitive particle ni as in ‑zu ni which works like a sort of adverbial gerund that means "without doing." It is possible to distinguish between coordination in Tabezu de neta (食べずで寝た; 'I did not eat, I slept') and subordination in Tabezu ni neta (食べずに寝た; 'I slept without eating (= while hungry)').

Negative with extender examples
| Extender | English | Japanese | Function |
|---|---|---|---|
| uchi (内) | "You good? Worst‑case scenario, you get caught before you even kill anyone." | "Ii? Saiaku na no wa, hitori mo korosanai uchi ni tsukamatchau koto yo" (「いい？ 最悪なのは、一人も殺さないうちに捕まっちゃうことよ」) | while not having done something; before doing something |
| uchi (内) | My lord, I dare not make myself so guilty, To give up willingly that noble title Your master wed me to: nothing but death Shall e'er divorce my dignities. (Note: As long as I am not dead, I shall never give up this title.) | Kyō yo, watashi wa, ō ga fuyo sareta sonshō o jibun de suteneba naran yō na tsumi o okasu hazu wa arimasen. Shinan uchi wa, kesshite kono kurai o hanaremasen. (卿よ、わたしは、王が附與された尊稱を自分で捨てねばならんやうな罪を犯す筈はありません。死なんうちは、決して此爵位を離れません。) | while not having done something; before doing something |
| copulae | I do not understand a word. (Note: More elevated than tatanai desu.) | Ichido mo yaku ni tatazu desu (一度も役に立たずです) | elevated negative predication |
| copulae | Of course the largest borrower is America which takes up to 40 percent of the total; Japan is far from equaling that but is in second place. (Note: More elevated than oyobanai.) | Mochiron saidai no karite wa zentai no yonjippāsento o shimete iru Amerika de ari, Nihon wa haruka ni oyobazu de aru ga, dainii de aru (もちろん最大の借り手は全体の40パーセントを占めているアメリカであり、日本は遥かに及ばずであるが、第二位である) | elevated negative predication |
| ni (に; copular infinitive) | I slept soundly without dreaming. (Note: More elevated than minaku.) | Yume mo mizu ni gussuri nemutta (夢も見ずにぐっすり眠った) | elevated negative conjunction |
| ni (に; copular infinitive) | If you keep steady, without running risks, you are safe. (Note: More elevated than shinaku.) | Bōken o sezu ni kataku yatte ireba buji da (冒険をせずに堅くやっていれば無事だ) | elevated negative conjunction |

== See also ==
- Japanese passive form
- Japanese potential form
- Japanese causative form
- Japanese hortative form
