= Rheanna Robinson =

Métis Canadian academic

Rheanna Robinson (born 1976/1977) is a Métis Canadian academic in the fields of Indigenous disability studies, First Nation studies, and Indigenous education. She is an associate professor of First Nations Studies in the Faculty of Indigenous Studies, Social Sciences and Humanities at the University of Northern British Columbia (UNBC).

== Early life and education ==
Robinson grew up in Smithers, British Columbia and is a member of the Manitoba Metis Federation. She attended UNBC, receiving her Bachelor of Arts in History and First Nations Studies in 2001 and Master of Arts in First Nations Studies in 2007. She then earned her Doctorate of Philosophy in Educational Studies from the University of British Columbia in 2016.

Robinson was diagnosed with multiple sclerosis at age 19.

== Career ==
Robinson joined UNBC in 2015 as the university's senior advisor on aboriginal relations. The following January, she took on the position of assistant professor in the Department of First Nations Studies.

In 2021, she was appointed to the British Columbia's Provincial Accessibility Committee established by the Accessible British Columbia Act.

In 2024, she published a children's book, Tanihki ekusi ka sipimohtiyen? (Why do you walk like that?), as a way to highlight Indigeneity in disability.

She is listed as in the Board of Directors for MS Canada for 2025-2026.

== Personal life ==
Robinson has two children.

== Publications ==
=== Articles ===
- Mills, Antonia; Robinson, Rheanna (2018). "Aboriginal Ethics: Traditional and Contemporary". In Poff, Deborah C.; Michalos, Alex C. (eds.). Encyclopedia of Business and Professional Ethics. Cham: Springer International Publishing. doi:10.1007/978-3-030-22767-8. ISBN 978-3-030-22765-4.
- Robinson, Rheanna; Charleyboy, Cindy; Verhaeglte, Catherine (2018). "How Coyote Created a Way for Indigenous Post-Secondary Education: The Legacy of Sister Mary Alice Danaher and the Week-end University". The Canadian Journal of Native Studies. 38 (2): 169–181.
- Burke, Susan; Robinson, Rheanna (June 2019). "Reflections on Métissage as an Indigenous research praxis". AlterNative: An International Journal of Indigenous Peoples. 15 (2): 150–157. doi:10.1177/1177180119837755. ISSN 1177-1801.
- Robers, Michael V.; Hurtubise, Brigitte; Roberts, Melissa H.; Robinson, Rheanna; Schmidt, Hollie; Amezcua, Lilyana (April 2023). "Multiple sclerosis in Indigenous Peoples of the Americas: A systematic review of incidence, prevalence, and outcomes". Multiple Sclerosis and Related Disorders. 72 104612. doi:10.1016/j.msard.2023.104612. PMID 36917888.
- Robinson, Rheanna (2023-06-01). "Indigenous Post-Secondary Institutes in British Columbia, Canada: Exemplars of Indigenous Control over Indigenous Education". Canadian Journal of Education. 46 (2): 386–411. doi:10.53967/cje-rce.5739. ISSN 1918-5979.
- Robinson, Rheanna (2024). "Decolonizing disability: Teachings from Tx̱ eemsim and voices from the lands of the Nisg ̱ a'a Nation". Canadian Journal of Disability Studies. 13 (3): 1–40. doi:10.15353/cjds.v13i3.1160.

=== Theses ===
- Robinson, Rheanna (2008). Education transformation: Issues for implementing an Aboriginal Choice School in Prince George, B.C. (Master of Arts thesis). University of Northern British Columbia. doi:10.24124/2008/bpgub504.
- Robinson, Rheanna (2016). Weaving Indigenous knowledge into the academy: promises and challenges from the perspectives of three Aboriginal post-secondary institutes in British Columbia (PhD thesis). University of British Columbia. doi:10.14288/1.0300167.
