= Jocelyn Joe-Strack =

Canadian scientist

- Education: University of Victoria; University of Northern British Columbia

TikTok information
- Page: Jocelyn Joe-Strack
- Followers: 38.9K
- Last updated: Apr 27, 2023

Jocelyn Joe-Strack, (Daqualama Da-kal-a-ma Aishihik First Nation) is an Indigenous Canadian scientist.

== Education ==
She earned a degree in microbiology and biochemistry from the University of Victoria, and a master's degree in Northern Resources and Environmental Studies from the University of Northern British Columbia. She pursued a PhD at the University of Saskatchewan's School of Environment and Sustainability. In 2017 she was one of three indigenous PhD students at the University of Saskatchewan to be awarded the Vanier Scholarship, a $150,000 scholarship over three years. Joe-Strack's PhD research looked at a traditional land use plan.

== Career ==
She is a microbiologist, and hydrologist at Yukon University, where she is research chair in Indigenous Knowledge.

In early 2019 Joe-Strack was invited by a Canadian diplomat on a four-week speaking tour of embassies in Berlin, Madrid, Paris, and Stockholm, where she discussed indigenous approaches to climate change.

She was selected for a TikTok accelerator program in late 2021.

In 2022 Joe-Strack attended COP27, where she spoke on several panels. In November 2022 she was also elected to the Yukon First Nations School Board.

== Personal life ==
Joe-Strack is a member of the Wolf Clan of Champagne and Aishihik First Nations. She speaks Southern Tutchone.

Her father, Willie Joe (d. 1997), was a member of the Yukon Native Brotherhood's executive council, which later became part of the Council of Yukon First Nations. In this role, he helped to negotiate the Umbrella Final Agreement. Joe-Strack's mother died in 2010.

Joe-Strack has one daughter.
