= Lynda Price =

First Nations chief

Chief of the Ulkatcho First Nation
- In office 2019–2025
- Preceded by: Betty Cahoose
- Succeeded by: Charlie Williams
- In office 2005–2009
- Preceded by: Betty Cahoose
- Succeeded by: Zach Parker

Personal details
- Born: 1959 (age 66–67) Bella Coola, British Columbia, Canada
- Spouse: Jerry Price
- Children: Carey Price
- Education: University of Northern British Columbia

Lynda Price (née Holte; born 1959) is a Canadian First Nations advocate and politician who served as chief of the Ulkatcho First Nation from 2005 to 2009, and then again from 2019 to 2025. She is Nuxalk and of Southern Carrier descent.

== Early life and education ==
Lynda Price was born in 1959 in Bella Coola, British Columbia to Teresa Holte (born September 1927), a survivor of the Williams Lake Residential school. Her father was James Holte, a storekeeper of Norwegian ancestry; he was born in Anahim Lake and died in 1964 at age 33. She has four older brothers.

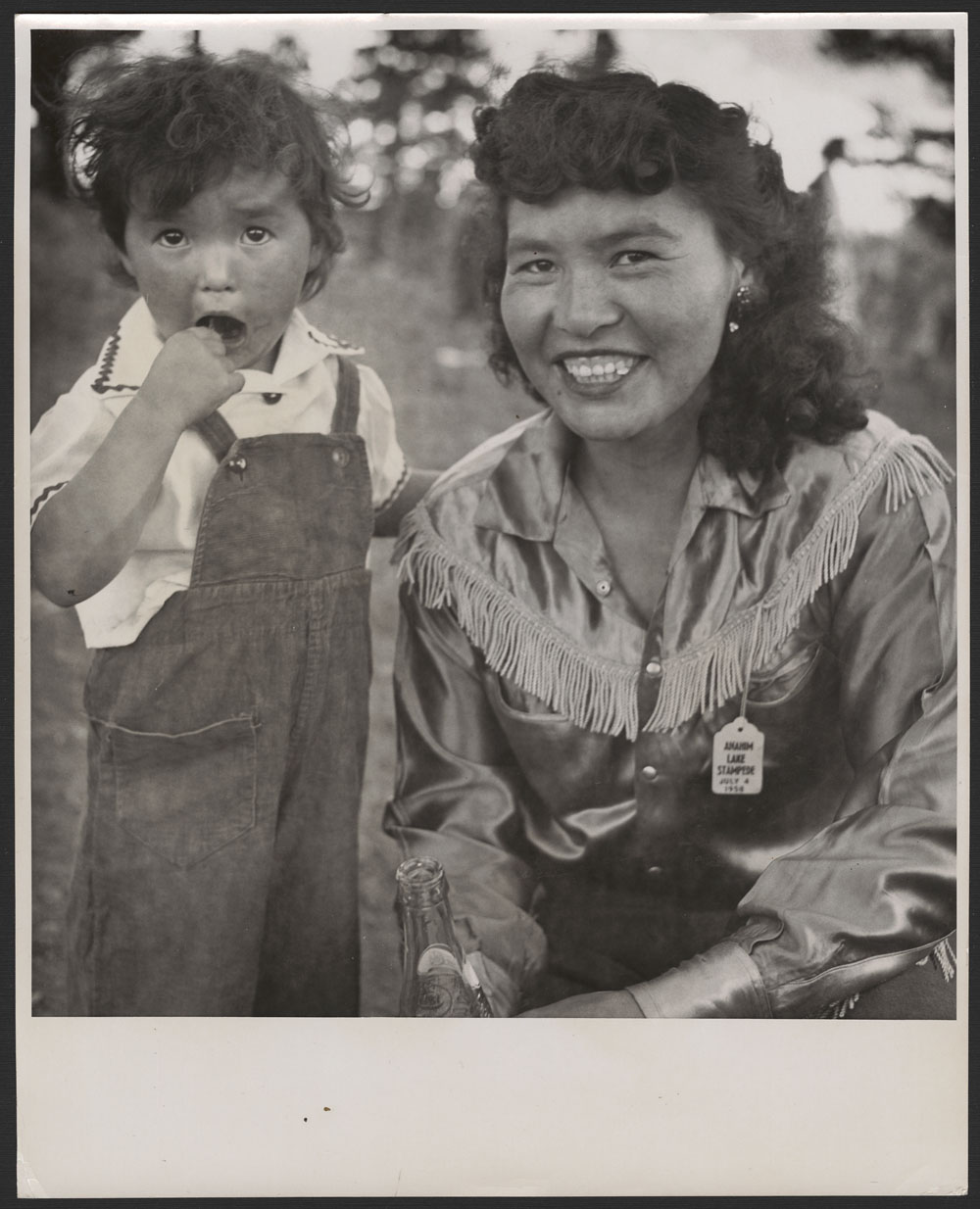
Lynda and her mother, Theresa Squinas Holte (born 1927), at Anahim Lake in 1964.

Her great-great-grandfather is Chief Domas Squinas of the Nuxalk. Lynda Price grew up on a ranch near Lessard Lake in British Columbia.

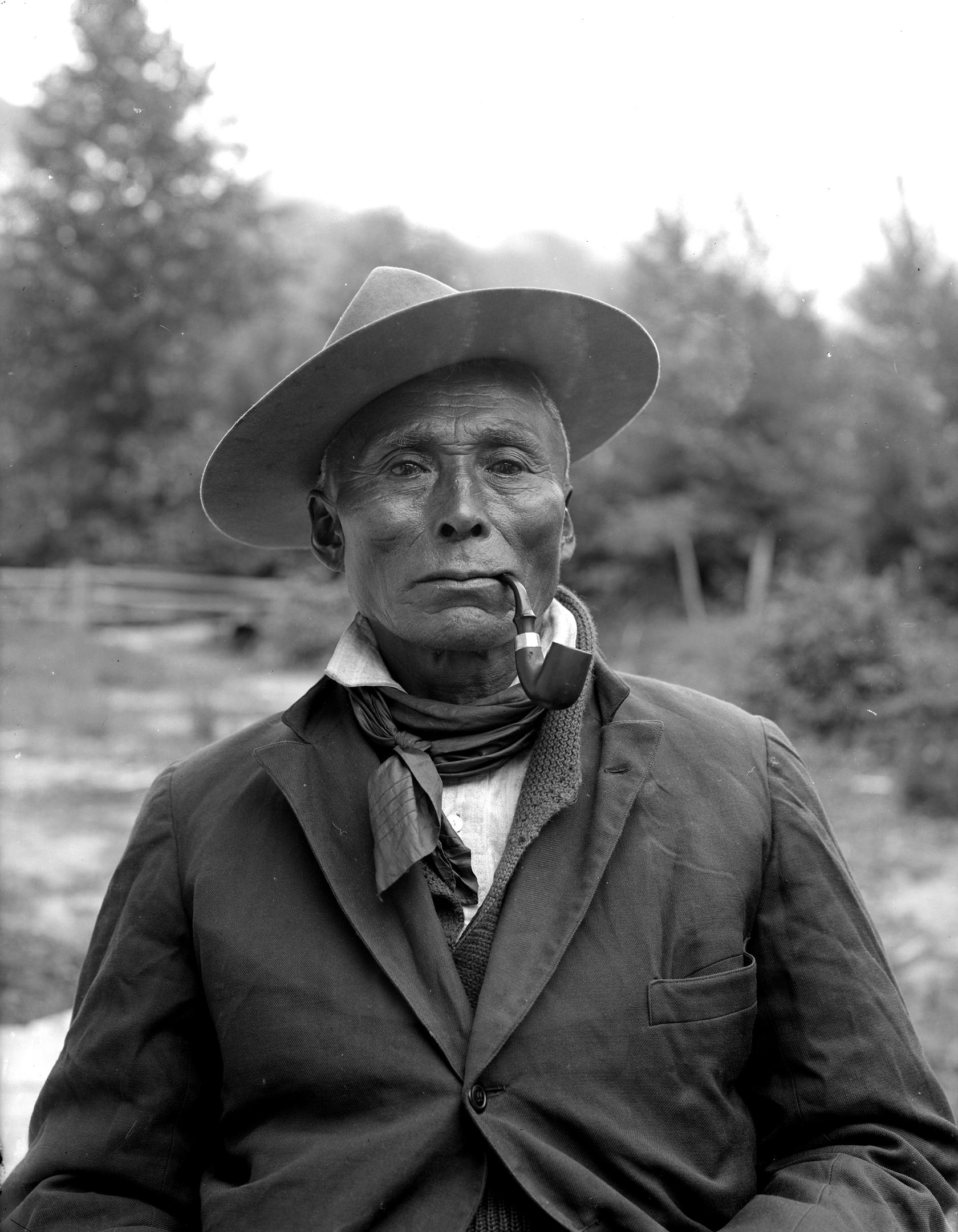
Chief Domas Squinas, Great-great-grandfather of Lynda Price

She earned a certificate in First Nations public administration at the University of Northern British Columbia, and in 2011 she graduated with a Bachelor of Arts degree in First Nations Studies with a minor in political science. She earned a Juris Doctor from Thompson Rivers University law school in 2015.

== Career ==
Price was the elected Chief of the Ulkatcho First Nation from 2005 to 2009. Prior to this she served as Ulkatcho band councillor for eight years. Afterwards, she ran for the position of Chief of the BC Assembly of First Nations, and was beaten by Jody Wilson-Raybould who would go on to become a member of parliament and the first indigenous Attorney General of Canada in 2015. She served another term from 2019 to 2025.

Price was the first woman elected to the Union of BC Chiefs' executive council, was a member of BC's Climate Solutions Council from 2022 to 2024, served on the BC Assembly of First Nations Board of Directors until 2024, and the NIB Trust.

== Personal life ==
Lynda is married to Jerry Price, a former ice hockey player, and Anahim Lake's adult-education teacher. She has two children including hockey player Carey Price, and three grandchildren.

She and family moved to Vancouver, but moved back to Anahim Lake in 1990 to be closer to her roots.

Like many Status Indian First Nations women who married non-status men, Price's mother was enfranchised as a non-Status Indian, losing Indian Status when she married James Holte in 1948. Even though Theresa is a First Nations woman, Price was rendered ineligible for Indian Status, since neither of her parents had Status at the time of her birth. In 1985, Price regained status (subsection 6(2)) through Bill C-31, an amendment to the Indian Act.

In October 2025, Price requested that the Indian Act "be amended to comply with Canada’s Constitution Act, Charter of Rights and Freedoms, s. 15 equality rights for siblings within the same family unit." Price's brother, Mike Holte, has daughter who was born before April 17, 1985, and was therefore granted 6(1) status under Bill C-31. As Price's two children were born after April 17, 1985, they were granted 6(2) status. This creates a situation where two siblings are not entitled to the same right to pass down their Indian Status to their grandchildren. Mike Holte's grandchildren have 6(2) Indian Status, while his sister Lynda Price's grandchildren are not entitled to Indian Status, given the Indian Act's second-generation cut-off rule. Price is making the argument that siblings within the same family unit should be granted equality under the Canadian Charter of Rights and Freedoms.
