= Japanese conjugation (mizenkei base) =

Element of Japanese language

Japanese conjugation, like the conjugation of verbs of many other languages, allows verbs to be morphologically modified to change their meaning or grammatical function. In Japanese, the beginning of a word (the stem) is preserved during conjugation, while the ending of the word is altered in some way to change the meaning (this is the inflectional suffix). Japanese verb conjugations are independent of person, number and gender (they do not depend on whether the subject is I, you, he, she, we, etc.); the conjugated forms can express meanings such as negation, present and past tense, volition, passive voice, causation, imperative and conditional mood, and ability. There are also special forms for conjunction with other verbs, and for combination with particles for additional meanings.

Japanese verbs have agglutinating properties: some of the conjugated forms are themselves conjugable verbs (or i-adjectives), which can result in several suffixes being strung together in a single verb form to express a combination of meanings.

A revision sheet visually summarizing the conjugations and uses described below

Conjugable words (verbs, i‑adjectives, and na‑adjectives) are traditionally considered to have six possible conjugational stems or bases (活用形, katsuyōkei; literally "conjugation forms"). This article lists those from the negative base (未然形, mizenkei), as well as the tentative base (推量形/意思形, suiryōkei/ishikei) that was split off during the post‑WWII spelling reforms.

== Negative ==
The negative (否定形・打消形, hiteikei/uchikeishikei), apart from being plainly negative, can commonly express affirmation of the contrary but in an understated way, for example in rhetorical negative questions which imply affirmation, often for politeness, such as for softening hortatives.

== Passive ==
The passive or passive potential turns the patient (or target) or victim of an action into a subject, which can be marked with the nominative particle ga.

== Potential ==
Potentiality (可能, kanō) describes the possibility for an action to happen, whether it involves an intentional acting agent or not.

== Causative ==
Causativity (使役, shieki) expresses how an instigator causes an agent to do something, whether by making or letting the agent (A) do it. The instigator (I) is marked with the nominative ga, while the agent is customarily marked with either ni or o depending on the original verb's transitivity.

== Hortative ==
The hortative or volitional expresses the speaker's or speakers' personal or collective volition ("I think I will do it", "we think we will do it"), or invitation to others ("let's do it"), to do something. The same form, otherwise known as the tentative, conjectural or presumptive, expresses subjective speculation ("I think/presume that's the case") or supposition ("perhaps that's the case", "that could be the case"). The tentative meanings are increasingly outdated as later generations of speakers favor using darō, deshō, or de gozaimashō as less ambiguous tentative markers.

== See also ==
- Japanese godan and ichidan verbs
- Honorific speech in Japanese
- Japanese adjectives
- Japanese particles
- Japanese grammar

== Bibliography ==
- Akimoto, Morihide (1 March 2001). Yamaguchi, Akiho; Akimoto, Morihide (eds.). 日本語文法大辞典 (in Japanese). Chiyoda, Tokyo: Meiji Shoin. pp. 709–710, 712–714, 742–743, 822–823, 871. ISBN 4-625-40300-6.
- Banno, Eri; Ikeda, Yōko; Ohno, Yutaka; Shinagawa, Chikako; Tokashiki, Kyōko (5 March 2020a) [20 May 1999]. GENKI: An Integrated Course in Elementary Japanese Ⅰ (3rd ed.). Chiyoda, Tokyo: The Japan Times Publishing. ISBN 978-4-7890-1730-5.
- Banno, Eri; Ikeda, Yōko; Ohno, Yutaka; Shinagawa, Chikako; Tokashiki, Kyōko (5 October 2020b) [20 October 1999]. GENKI: An Integrated Course in Elementary Japanese Ⅱ (3rd ed.). Chiyoda, Tokyo: The Japan Times Publishing. ISBN 978-4-7890-1732-9.
- Frellesvig, Bjarke (2010). A History of the Japanese Language. New York: Cambridge University Press. ISBN 978-0-521-65320-6.
- Fujii, Toshihiro (1 March 2001). Yamaguchi, Akiho; Akimoto, Morihide (eds.). 日本語文法大辞典 (in Japanese). Chiyoda, Tokyo: Meiji Shoin. pp. 38–39, 58–59, 100–101. ISBN 4-625-40300-6.
- Henderson, Harold Gould (1948) [1943]. Handbook of Japanese Grammar (revised ed.). Cambridge, Massachusetts: The Riverside Press.
- Iori, Isao; Takanashi, Shino; Nakanishi, Kumiko; Yamada, Toshihiro (15 November 2018). Matsuoka, Hiroshi (ed.). 初(しょ)級(きゅう)を教(おし)える人(ひと)のための日(に)本(ほん)文(ぶん)法(ぽう)ハンドブック (in Japanese). Chiyoda, Tokyo: 3A Corporation.
- Itoi, Michihiro (1 March 2001). Yamaguchi, Akiho; Akimoto, Morihide (eds.). 日本語文法大辞典 (in Japanese). Chiyoda, Tokyo: Meiji Shoin. pp. 614–617, 821–822. ISBN 4-625-40300-6.
- Kaiser, Stefan; Ichikawa, Yasuko; Kobayashi, Noriko; Yamamoto, Hilofumi (2013) [2001]. Japanese: A Comprehensive Grammar. Routledge Comprehensive Grammars (2nd ed.). Milton Park, Abingdon, Oxfordshire, Oxford; New York: Routledge. ISBN 978-0-203-08519-6.
- Kimura, Masanori (1 March 2001). しる （知る）. In Yamaguchi, Akiho; Akimoto, Morihide (eds.). 日本語文法大辞典 (in Japanese). Chiyoda, Tokyo: Meiji Shoin. pp. 353–354. ISBN 4-625-40300-6.
- Komatsu, Kōzō (1 March 2001). Yamaguchi, Akiho; Akimoto, Morihide (eds.). 日本語文法大辞典 (in Japanese). Chiyoda, Tokyo: Meiji Shoin. pp. 67–68, 161–162. ISBN 4-625-40300-6.
- Kubota, Atsushi (1 March 2001). Yamaguchi, Akiho; Akimoto, Morihide (eds.). 日本語文法大辞典 (in Japanese). Chiyoda, Tokyo: Meiji Shoin. pp. 32–33, 747. ISBN 4-625-40300-6.
- Koyanagi, Tomokazu (March 2014). 中央語における動詞活用の歴史 (PDF). 全国方言文法辞典資料集 (in Japanese). 2. 方言文法研究会: 20–29. NCID: BB1529267X. Archived (PDF) from the original on 20 October 2018.
- Kuno, Susumu (1973). The Structure of the Japanese Language. Cambridge, Massachusetts; London, England: MIT Press. ISBN 0-262-11049-0.
- Kuno, Susumu (1 April 1983). 新日本文法研究 (in Japanese). Chiyoda, Tokyo: Taishukan Publishing.
- Lammers, Wayne P. (2005). Japanese the Manga Way: An Illustrated Guide to Grammar and Structure (in English and Japanese). Berkeley, California: Stone Bridge Press. ISBN 978-1-880656-90-7.
- Makino, Seiichi; Tsutsui, Michio (20 May 2018) [20 March 1986]. A Dictionary of Basic Japanese Grammar 日本語基本文法辞典 (77th ed.). Minato, Tokyo: The Japan Times. ISBN 978-4-7890-0454-1.
- Martin, Samuel Elmo (2004) [1975]. A Reference Grammar of Japanese (revised ed.). Honolulu: University of Hawai'i Press. ISBN 0-8248-2818-6.
- Matsuoka McClain, Yoko (1986) [1981]. Handbook of Modern Japanese Grammar: including Lists of Words and Expressions with English Equivalents for Reading Aid 口語日本文法便覧（日本語特殊表現とその英語相当訳及び例題付）. Chiyoda, Tokyo: The Hokuseido Press. ISBN 4-590-00570-0.
- Ministry of Education, Science, Sports and Culture (15 September 1935a). 口語法別記 (in Japanese) (3rd ed.). Kyōbashi, Tokyo: Dainippon Tosho.
- Miura, Akira (2011). Essential Japanese Vocabulary: Learn to Avoid Common (and Embarrassing!) Mistakes. Tuttle Publishing. ISBN 978-4-8053-1127-1.
- Miyake, Toshihiro (1 April 2016). 可能動詞の成立. 日本語の研究 (in Japanese). 12 (2): 1–17. doi:10.20666/nihongonokenkyu.12.2_1. Archived from the original on 20 November 2017.
- Nakamura, Masayuki (31 March 2009). 日本語動詞の音便について (PDF). Kotonoha (in Japanese) (76). Japan: 古代文字資料館: 1–3. Archived (PDF) from the original on 19 August 2019.
- Nakano, Kotoyo (September 2008). "Japanese potential verb" 日本語の可能動詞 (PDF). 下関市立大学論集 (in Japanese). 52 (1–2). 下関市立大学学会: 103–114. ISSN 0387-5296. OCLC 183202722. SC20052000109. Archived (PDF) from the original on 26 January 2021.
- Shibuya, Katsumi (March 2002). Ōnishi, Takuichirō (ed.). 方言文法調査ガイドブック (PDF) (in Japanese). Kita, Tokyo: National Institute for Japanese Language and Linguistics.
- Poser, William John (23 November 1984). The Phonetics and Phonology of Tone and Intonation in Japanese (PDF) (doctoral thesis). Massachusetts Institute of Technology.
- Rubin, Jay (January 2004) [January 2002]. Making Sense of Japanese: What the Textbooks Don’t Tell You 日(に)本(ほん)語(ご)の秘(ひ)訣(けつ) (3rd ed.). Kodansha International. ISBN 4-7700-2802-4.
- Sakaki, Mika (17 January 2019). 動詞の音便の方言学的研究―サ行イ音便を中心として― (doctoral thesis) (in Japanese). Tohoku University. Archived from the original on 28 June 2021.
- Shirane, Haruo (2005). Classical Japanese: A Grammar. New York: Columbia University Press. ISBN 978-0-231-13524-5.
- Suzuki, Hideo (1 March 2001). Yamaguchi, Akiho; Akimoto, Morihide (eds.). 日本語文法大辞典 (in Japanese). Chiyoda, Tokyo: Meiji Shoin. pp. 336, 359–360, 598–599, 745–747, 843–844. ISBN 4-625-40300-6.
- Yada, Tsutomu (1 March 2001). Yamaguchi, Akiho; Akimoto, Morihide (eds.). 日本語文法大辞典 (in Japanese). Chiyoda, Tokyo: Meiji Shoin. pp. 209–210, 216. ISBN 4-625-40300-6.
- Yamaguchi, Akiho (1 March 2001). Yamaguchi, Akiho; Akimoto, Morihide (eds.). 日本語文法大辞典 (in Japanese). Chiyoda, Tokyo: Meiji Shoin. pp. 63–64, 162–163, 424–425, 502, 508–509, 728, 777, 822, 853. ISBN 4-625-40300-6.
- Yamauchi, Keisuke (1 March 2001). なさる（為さる）. In Yamaguchi, Akiho; Akimoto, Morihide (eds.). 日本語文法大辞典 (in Japanese). Chiyoda, Tokyo: Meiji Shoin. pp. 557–558. ISBN 4-625-40300-6.
