= Don Cozzetto =

Don Cozzetto was a Canadian academic and university administrator. He was born and raised in Rossland, British Columbia but has spent most of his career in the United States. He received his B.A. from Notre Dame University College in Nelson, British Columbia, his M.S. from Carleton University in Ottawa, and his Ph.D. in Public Policy and Administration from Virginia Polytechnic Institute and State University. He specializes in public administration, human resource management, and aboriginal government.

Prior to beginning his academic career, he spent ten years working for housing corporations in the Yukon and the Northwest Territories.

From 1999 to 2003, he was Vice President for Academic Affairs of Northern State University in South Dakota, where he served the following year as Interim President. From 1 July 2006 to early June 2008, he was President and Vice-Chancellor of the University of Northern British Columbia. His resignation occurred amidst deep controversy over changes to the university budget and staffing.
