= Notre Dame University College =

Private university in Nelson, Canada (1950–1984)

- Type: University College
- Active: 1950–1984
- Affiliations: Roman Catholic
- Location: Nelson, British Columbia, Canada; 49.4767°N 117.2948°W

Notre Dame University College was a private university in Nelson, British Columbia, Canada. It was established in 1950 by the Roman Catholic diocese of Nelson and opened with twelve students. In 1951 Notre Dame became affiliated as a junior college with Gonzaga University in Spokane, Washington, United States, and in 1961 it became affiliated with St. Francis Xavier University in Antigonish, Nova Scotia. In 1963, it was chartered as a private four-year university by the Province of British Columbia. Shortly thereafter, it adopted the name Notre Dame University of Nelson (NDU).

At the height of its operation, it enrolled 2,000 students in a variety of academic disciplines. The university granted both Major B.A. Degrees, with intensive work in one subject area, and B.A. Degrees with Concentrations in two subject areas. It hosted a wide range of foreign students, including many from Hong Kong, Indonesia, and the United States.

Dr. Hugh L. Keenleyside, a noted Canadian civil servant and scholar, served as Chancellor and Chairman of the Board of Governors of Notre Dame University College from 1969 to 1977.

Prominent Faculty members included Dr. P.J. Micallef, Professor of Philosophy, a Laval scholar, and Dr. L.A.D. Morey, Professor of English, a former student of J.R.R. Tolkien at Oxford University, among many other highly regarded academicians. NDU served as the headquarters of the Canadian National Ski Team and embarked on a student-inspired scheme to finance a new student union building independently of university funds.

Although the University attracted sufficient numbers of students, it encountered financial difficulties, perhaps in part connected to internal strife - Notre Dame was the first university in Canada to endorse a faculty labour union. In 1976, at the request of the Notre Dame Board of Directors, the Province of British Columbia assumed control, renaming it the David Thompson University Centre and placing it under the administration of the University of Victoria. In spite of its local and regional popularity, the provincial government found the per-student cost too high and closed it in 1984.

== Notable alumni ==
- Don Cozzetto
- Edward John
- Andrew Petter
- Sadeq Qotbzadeh
