= University Hospital of Northern British Columbia =

Geography
- Location: Prince George, British Columbia, British Columbia, Canada
- Coordinates: 53.9118°N 122.7643°W

Organization
- Type: acute care, cancer care, trauma centre
- Affiliated university: University of Northern British Columbia, University of British Columbia

Services
- Emergency department: Yes - Level III trauma centre
- Beds: 219

History
- Founded: 1960 - as Prince George and District Hospital

Links
- Website: www.northernhealth.ca/find-a-facility/hospitals/university-hospital-northern-british-columbia-uhnbc

The University Hospital of Northern British Columbia (UHNBC) is the largest Level III trauma centre in Northern BC. UHNBC is a teaching hospital that supports the Northern Medical Program, a joint medical program by the UBC Faculty of Medicine and the University of Northern British Columbia (UNBC) for training doctors in British Columbia, Canada.

== History ==
Multiple predecessors have been succeeded by what is now the University Hospital. The first major one being a railway construction hospital in 1914 (although a log hospital had already been built). A private hospital was also built. A hospital called the 'Pine Manor" hospital opened in 1918. The immediate predecessor to the University Hospital was opened in 1945 and had 112 beds by the time the University Hospital came around.

By the 50s it was decided that a new hospital was needed and on 14 May 1958 a sod turning ceremony took place for the new hospital.

The hospital was opened on Saturday, 16 January 1960 by provincial health minister Eric Martin. Tours were given on both Saturday and Sunday to over 7,000 people. When it initially opened, the hospital had 125 beds and cost $2.04 million (equivalent to $19.23 million in 2022)
