= Geoffrey R. Weller =

British academic

Founding President of the University of Northern British Columbia
- In office 1990–1995

Personal details
- Born: January 25, 1942 Tonbridge, Kent, England
- Died: July 22, 2000 (aged 58)

Geoffrey R. Weller (January 25, 1942 – July 22, 2000) was a Canadian teacher, scholar and the founding president of the University of Northern British Columbia from 1991 to 1995. After his presidency, he remained at UNBC, teaching International Studies. He oversaw the school's main campus construction in Prince George, B.C., and established its first five special focus areas: Women's Studies, Environmental Studies, First Nations Studies, Northern Studies, and International Studies. In 2001, UNBC named its library after him.

== Education and career ==
Born in England, Weller graduated high school as an American exchange student in Ann Arbor, Michigan, in 1961. He received a BSC (Honors) in Economics from the University of Hull and an MA in Political Science from McMaster University. He pursued a PhD at McGill University but did not complete a dissertation.

In 1965, Weller began teaching at Bishop's University and in 1971 moved to Lakehead University, where he became Dean of Arts and later Vice President. He helped establish the Lakehead University Centre for Northern Studies, the Northern Ontario Medical Program and the Association of Circumpolar Universities.

Weller was a visiting professor at the University of Minnesota Duluth (1973), the University of Ottawa (1977-1978), and Simon Fraser University (1995). He also joined the Social Sciences and Humanities Research Council of Canada, and chaired the Association of Circumpolar Universities, Canadian Association for Security and Intelligence Studies and the Thunder Bay District Health Council.

In 1999, Weller was awarded an Honorary Doctorate in Administrative Science from the University of Lapland in Finland for helping create the International Circumpolar University, and for assisting the University of Lapland in increased activity with Canadian universities.
