= William Poser =

Canadian-American linguist

William John Poser is a Canadian-American linguist who is known for his extensive work with the historical linguistics of Native American languages, especially those of the Athabascan family.

He got his B.A. from Harvard in 1979 and his Ph.D. from MIT in 1985, his dissertation being about suprasegmental phenomena in the phonology of Japanese. He then taught at Stanford, and then at the University of Northern British Columbia. He has published extensively about the Carrier language in which he has done ample fieldwork. He is also known as a frequent blogger at the Language Log.

== Selected publications ==
- Poser, William J. (1998) Nak'albun/Dzinghubun Whut'enne Bughuni (Stuart/Trembleur Lake Carrier Lexicon). Vanderhoof, BC: Yinka Dene Language Institute. Second edition.
- Poser, William J. (2000) Saik'uz Whut'en Hubughunek (Stoney Creek Carrier Lexicon). Vanderhoof, BC: Saik'uz First Nation. Fourth edition. (March 2000)
- Poser, William J. (2005) "Noun Classification in Carrier". Anthropological Linguistics 47.2.143-168. prepublication version
- Poser, William J. (2009) The Carrier Language: a Brief Introduction. Prince George, British Columbia: College of New Caledonia Press. ISBN 978-0-921087-45-8.
