= Japanese: A Comprehensive Grammar =

2001 grammar book

- Author: Stefan Kaiser; Yasuko Ichikawa; Noriko Kobayashi; Hilofumi Yamamoto
- Language: English
- Publication date: 2001
- Pages: 656
- ISBN: 978-0415099196

Japanese: A Comprehensive Grammar is a grammar book of Japanese language written by University of Tsukuba professor Stefan Kaiser, University of Tokyo professor Yasuko Ichikawa, University of Tsukuba associate professor Noriko Kobayashi and University of Tsukuba assistant professor Hilofumi Yamamoto. The first edition was published by Routledge in 2001, and the second in 2013.
