= University of Northern British Columbia =

Public university in Prince George, British Columbia

- Nizdeh Nekeyoh Hohudel’eh Baiyoh (Carrier)
- Motto: 'En Cha Huná (Carrier)
- Motto in English: He/she also lives (translated as "respecting all forms of life")
- Type: Public university
- Established: 1990; 36 years ago
- Academic affiliations: UArctic, Universities Canada
- Endowment: US$62.8 million (2020)
- Chancellor: Darlene McIntosh
- President: Bill Owen (Interim)
- Provost: Michel S. Beaulieu
- Total staff: 790
- Students: 2,422 (2024-25 FTE)
- Undergraduates: 2,927
- Postgraduates: 730
- Location: Canada
- Campus: UNBC Main Campus (Prince George); Wood Innovation and Design Centre (Prince George); Peace River-Liard Campus (Fort St. John); Northwest Campus (Terrace); South-Central Campus (Quesnel)
- Tagline: Canada's Green University
- Colours: Gold and green
- Nickname: Timberwolves
- Sporting affiliations: U Sports
- Mascot: Alpha
- Website: unbc.ca
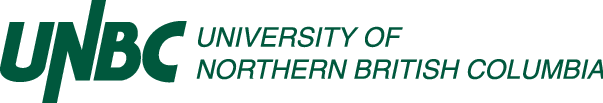

The University of Northern British Columbia (UNBC) is a university serving the northern region of the Canadian province of British Columbia. The main campus is located in Prince George, with additional campuses located in Prince Rupert, Terrace, Quesnel, and Fort St. John. Because of its northern latitude, UNBC is a member of the University of the Arctic. In the 2020–21 academic year, 4,253 students were enrolled at UNBC.

In 2022, Maclean's magazine ranked UNBC as the number one university of its size in Canada, in the Primarily Undergraduate category. UNBC also finished first in the rankings in 2015 and 2016 and routinely finishes in the top three in its category. In 2026, UNBC placed second in its category. In 2007, the university obtained the trademark for "Canada's Green University".

== History ==
In response to a grass-roots movement spearheaded by the Interior University Society, the Legislative Assembly of British Columbia established the university when it passed Bill 40, the University of Northern British Columbia Act, on June 22, 1990. UNBC offered a limited number of courses in rented office space in 1992 and 1993, but its campus was opened officially by Elizabeth II, Queen of Canada, on 17 August 1994. Some 1,500 students were enrolled that year, upon the completion two years of construction and the opening of the Prince George campus.

The university gained attention with the introduction of the Northern Medical Program (NMP), a collaboration with the University of British Columbia. Through this arrangement, several academic physicians have been attracted to the city, which has led to an emerging academic medical community.

== Organization and administration ==
The governance was modeled on the provincial University of Toronto Act 1906, which established a bicameral system of university government comprising a Senate (composed of members of the faculty), responsible for academic policy, and a Board of Governors (composed of members of the community), which exercises exclusive control over financial policy and having formal authority in all other matters. The President, appointed by the board, was to provide a link between the two bodies and to perform institutional leadership. The founding President, in post until 1995, was Geoffrey R. Weller.

The University of Northern British Columbia is an active member of the University of the Arctic. UArctic is an international cooperative network based in the Circumpolar Arctic region, consisting of more than 200 universities, colleges, and other organizations with an interest in promoting education and research in the Arctic region.

The university participates in UArctic’s mobility program north2north. The aim of that program is to enable students of member institutions to study in different parts of the North.

== Campus ==
University rankings

World rankings
- QS World: 781–790 (2024)
- THE World: 1,201-1,500

Canadian rankings
- QS National: 26 (2024)
- THE National: 30
- Maclean's Undergraduate: 2
- Maclean's Reputation: 32

The Prince George campus is located on Cranbrook Hill, overlooking the city of Prince George from the west, and is widely renowned for its innovative architecture. The award-winning Wood Innovation and Design Centre, designed by Michael Green Architecture, was the world’s tallest modern all-timber structure upon completion and serves as a facility for the research and education on the uses of wood. The Wood Innovation Research Lab is an example of Passive House design in a northern climate.

The separate buildings are linked by an agora that is partially below ground level. It is the efficient heating system connected to all the core campus buildings that permits UNBC to pursue its goal of heating the university by the gasification of clean-burning, renewable wood pellets collected from the waste of pine trees killed by the mountain pine beetle epidemic.

The buildings at UNBC are designed to represent the northern landscape. The Canfor Winter Garden area has a flowing blue staircase below a ceiling of wooden lattices, representing the west coast rain forests. The cafeteria has a lighthouse design that represents the rugged coastline of northern British Columbia. Another structural feature, a pair of triangular glass peaks, represents mountains and functions as skylights above the UNBC Bookstore.

On October 13, 2010, UNBC was co-awarded the Campus Sustainability Leadership Award by the Association for the Advancement of Sustainability in Higher Education (AASHE) for its bio-energy project, which targets a reduction in fossil fuel use by supplying 85% of the heating needs at UNBC.

=== University Hospital of Northern British Columbia ===
The University Hospital of Northern British Columbia is a Level III trauma centre in Northern BC.

== Culture ==
=== Motto ===
The UNBC motto, 'En cha huná, directly translates as "that person also lives" in the Nak'azdli (Fort St. James) dialect of the Indigenous language Dakelh (Carrier). It is interpreted in English as "respecting all forms of life".

=== Student life ===
The Northern Undergraduate Student Society, known colloquially as NUGSS, represents the undergraduate student body at the University of Northern British Columbia. A non-profit organization, NUGSS serves and represents all undergraduate students at all UNBC campuses. The Society governs student-led organizations on campus, provides the health and dental plan, advocates for student needs in local transit, and hosts various events. Annual NUGSS events include Backyard BBQ, Jump Back to NYE, and Final Affair.

UNBC's Student Life department is dedicated to student success, and aims to raise student engagement in the UNBC community. Led by community leaders known as "student ambassadors", Student Life hosts regular events, workshops, and volunteer opportunities for all UNBC students. The Student Life department is also in charge of UNBC's Orientation and Weeks of Welcome.

The Northern British Columbia Graduate Student Society (NBCGSS), represents about 750 full-time and part-time graduate students. It was founded in the year of 1997, less than a decade after UNBC was founded. Every year NBCGSS holds events like winter/semi formals, a ski trip and a summer trip. NBCGSS is a member of the British Columbia Federation of Students (BCFS).

The UNBC First Nations Centre provides support services for indigenous students, including bringing in elders, counselling, and events such as talking circles and sweat lodges. The Northern Pride Centre or (also known as the "PC") offers a safe space, support, and resources to the LGBTQ and ally community, including a new Positive Space Campaign designed by UNBC

=== Student media ===
- Over the Edge, a bi-weekly student newspaper. Established in 1994.
- CFURadio 88.7 FM, the independent campus community radio station.
- Pulpmill Fiction, a student-led creative writing anthology that publishes undergraduate, graduate, and alumni poetry, fiction, and creative non-fiction.

=== Athletics ===
The Timberwolves compete in the Canada West Universities Athletic Association. UNBC fields men's and women's teams in soccer and basketball.

== Gallery ==
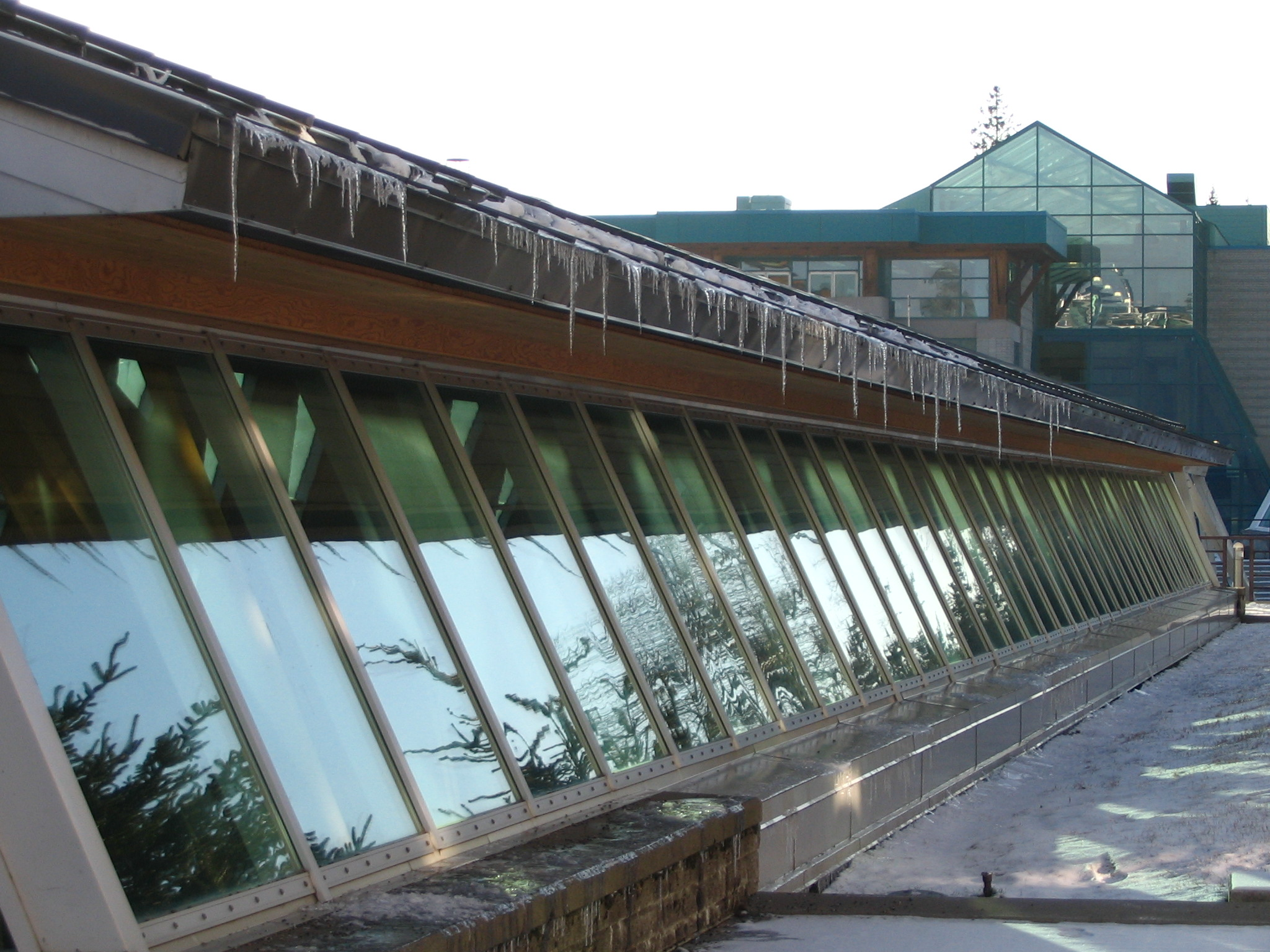
UNBC's Student Services Street

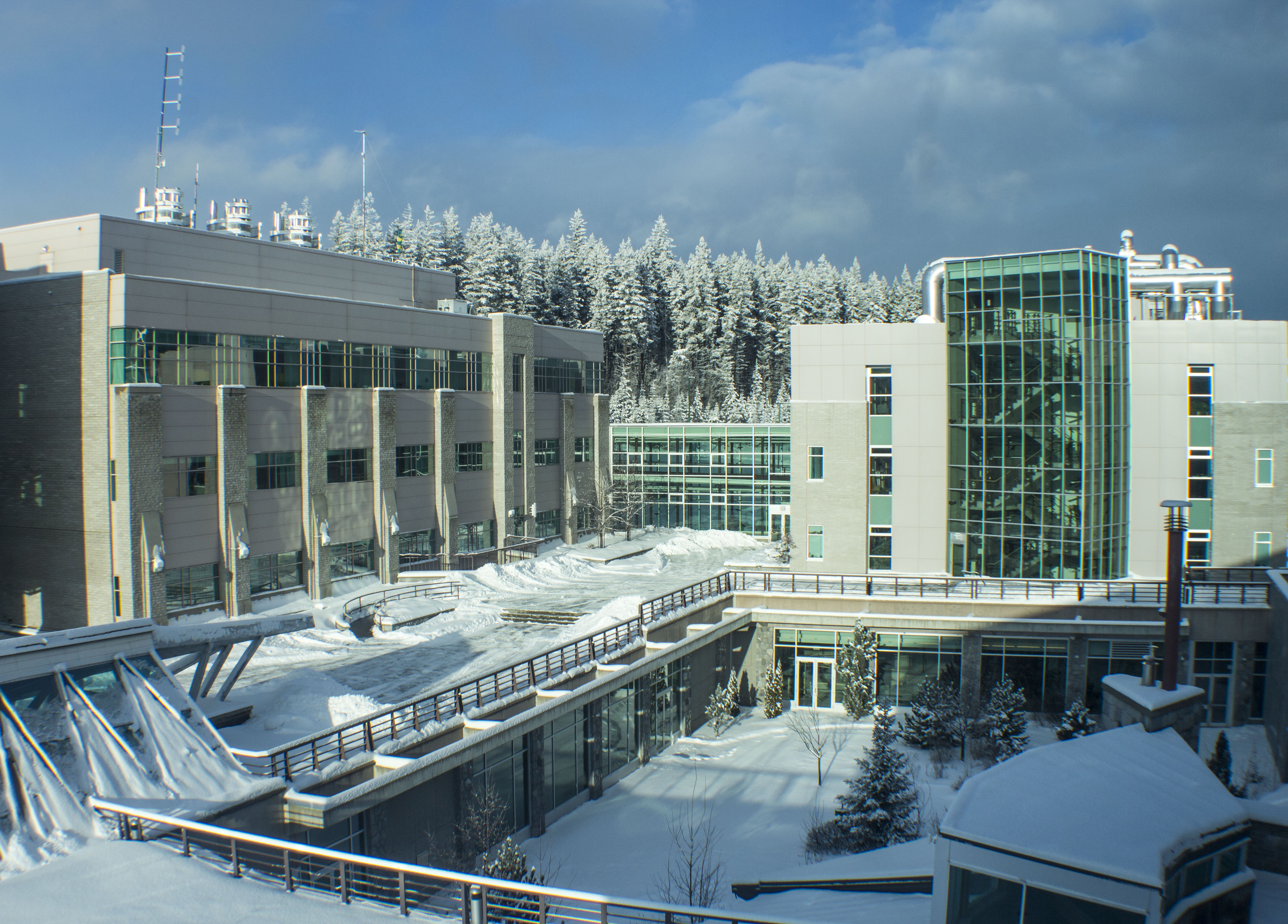
Main building

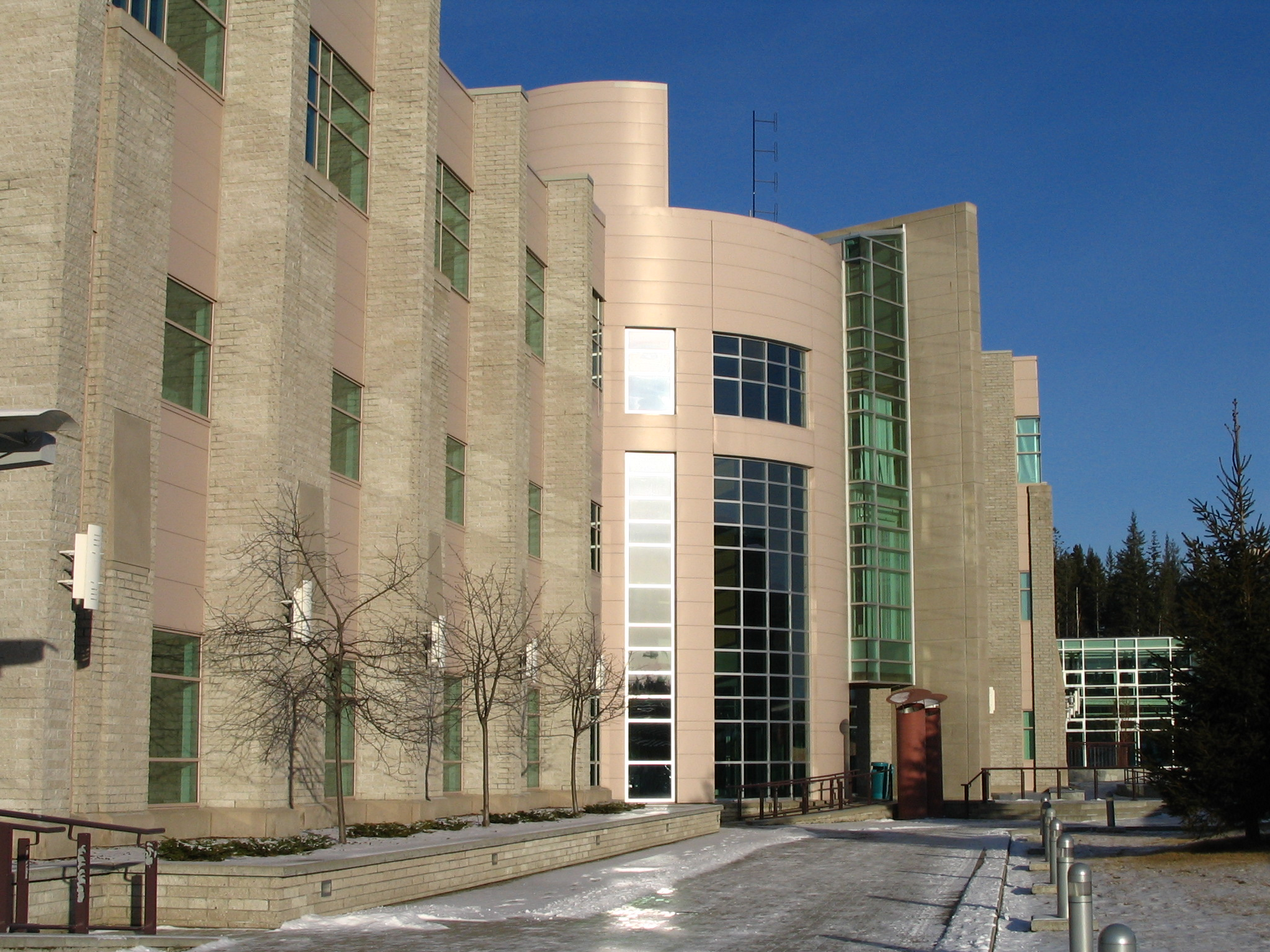
Research Laboratory Building

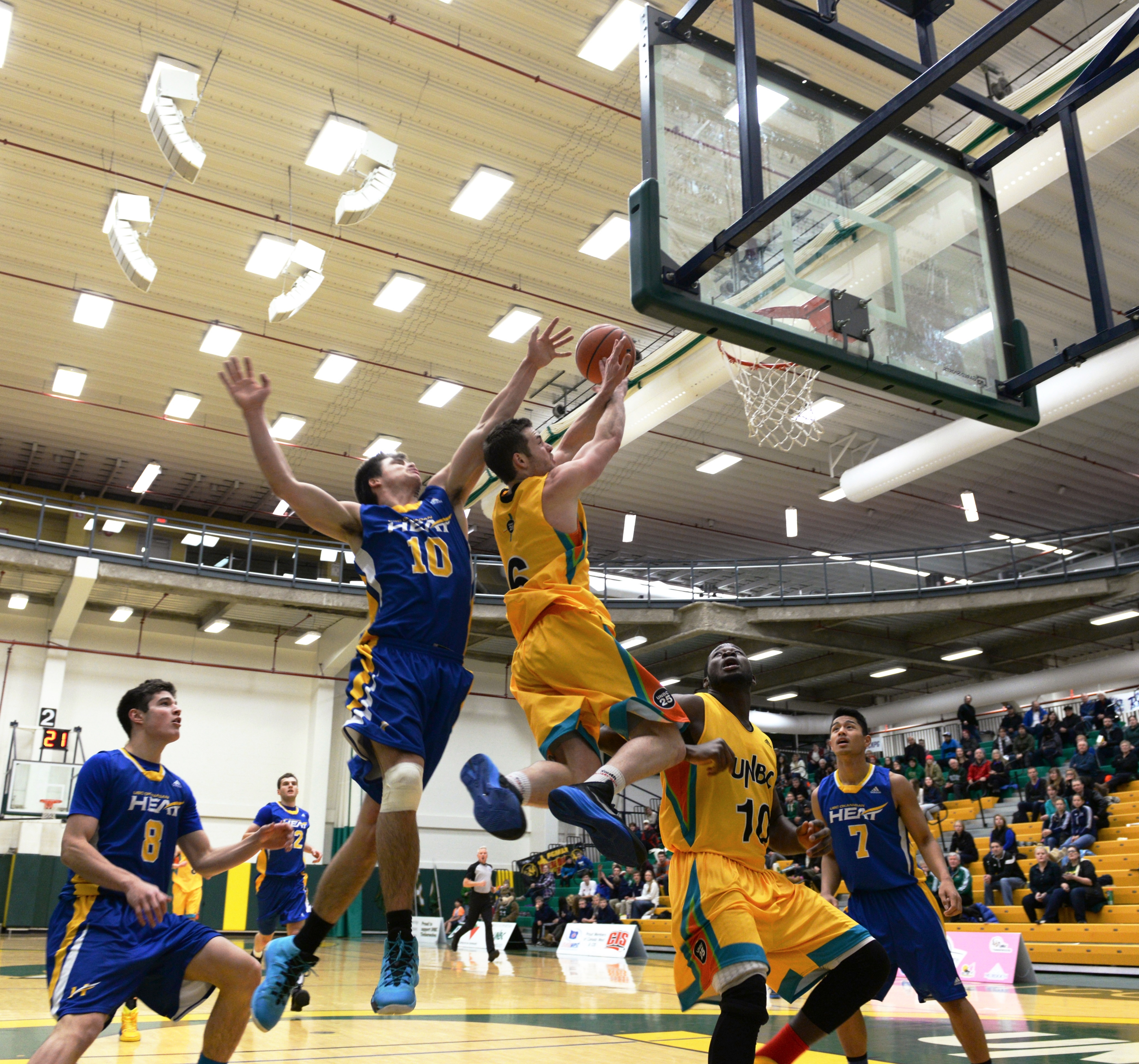
UNBC Timberwolves basketball team playing UBC Okanagan Heat

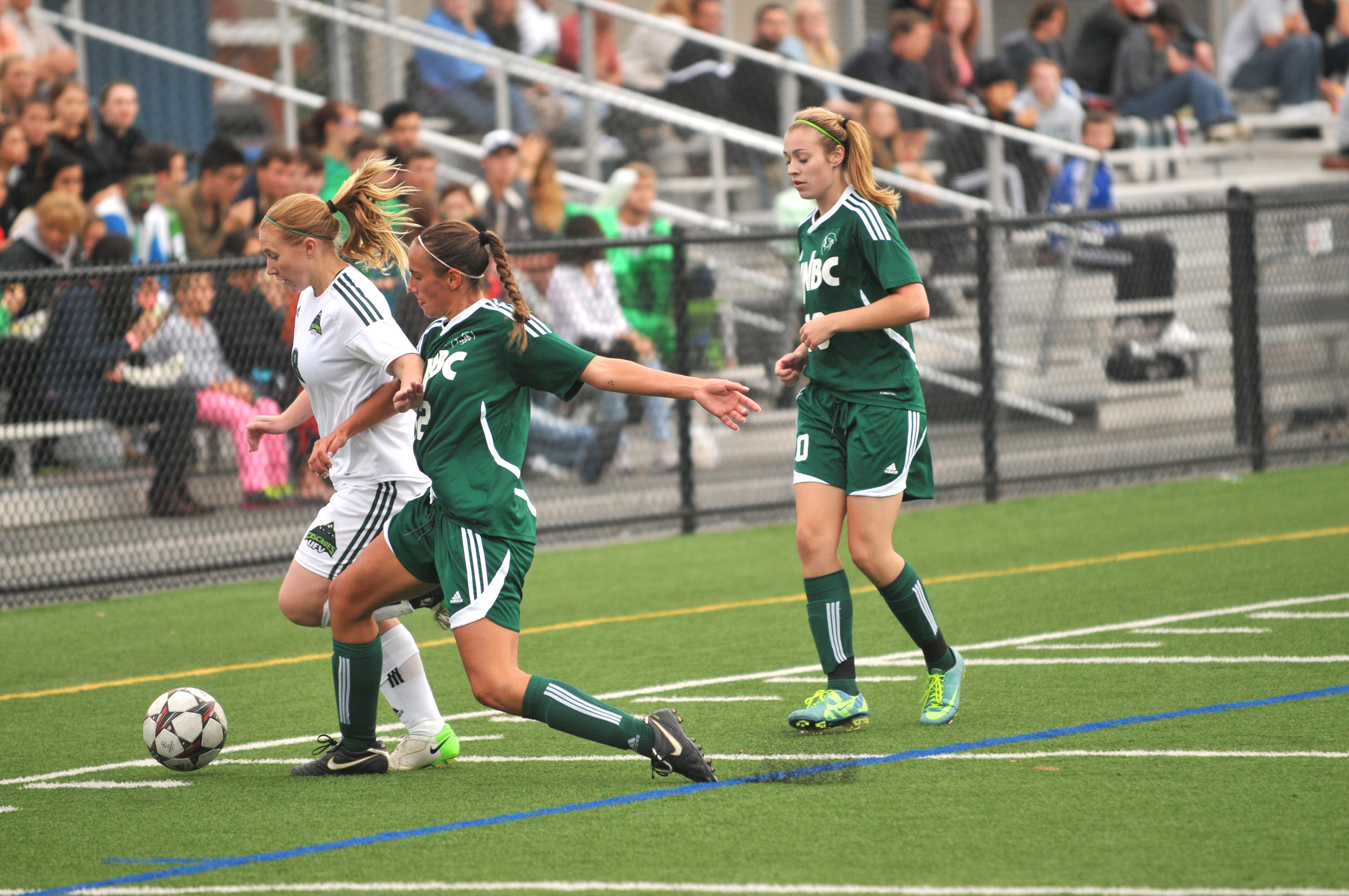
Women's soccer match versus UFV

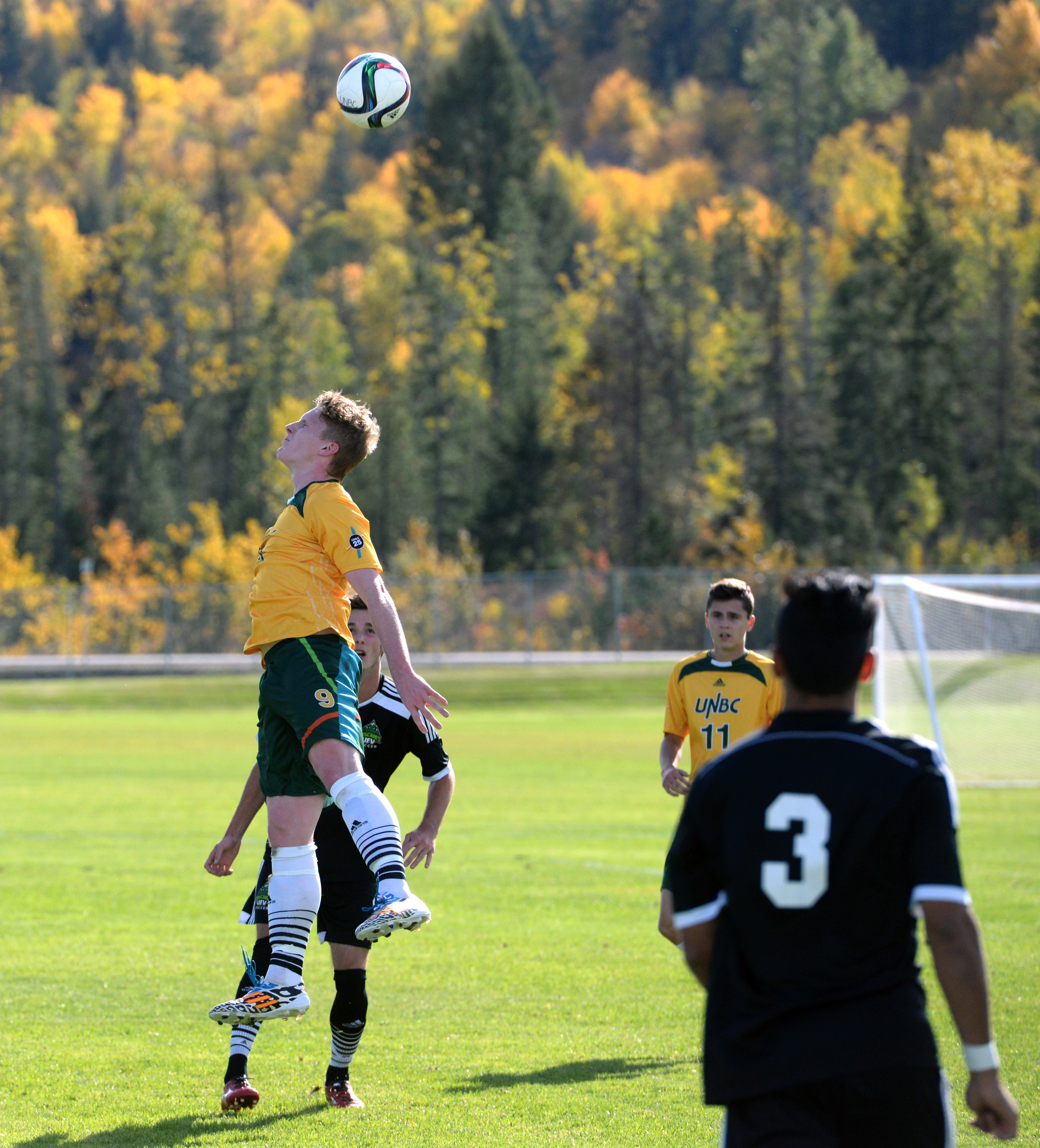
Men's soccer match

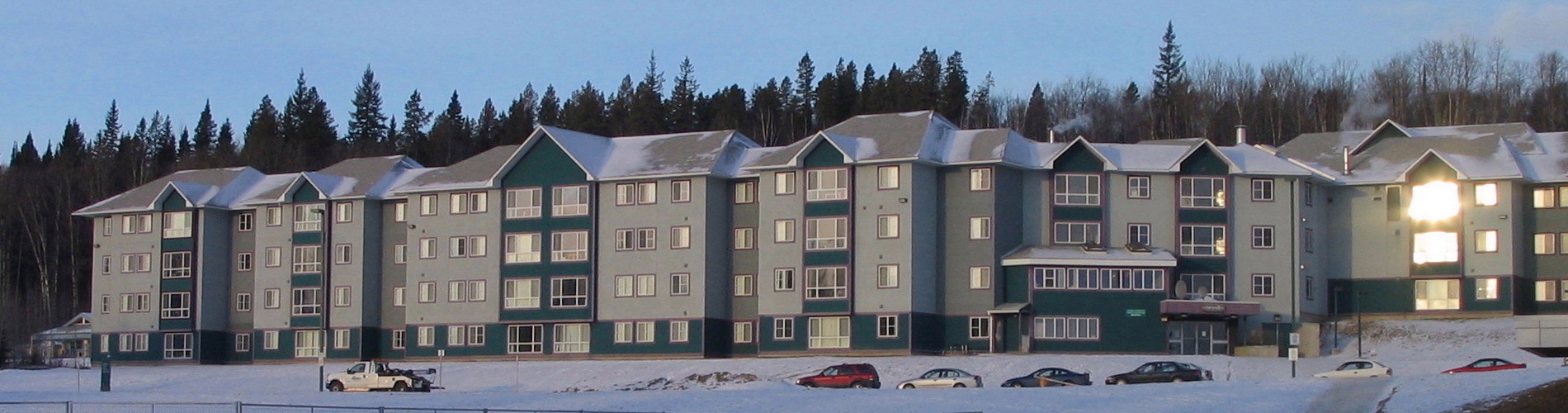
Neyoh residence

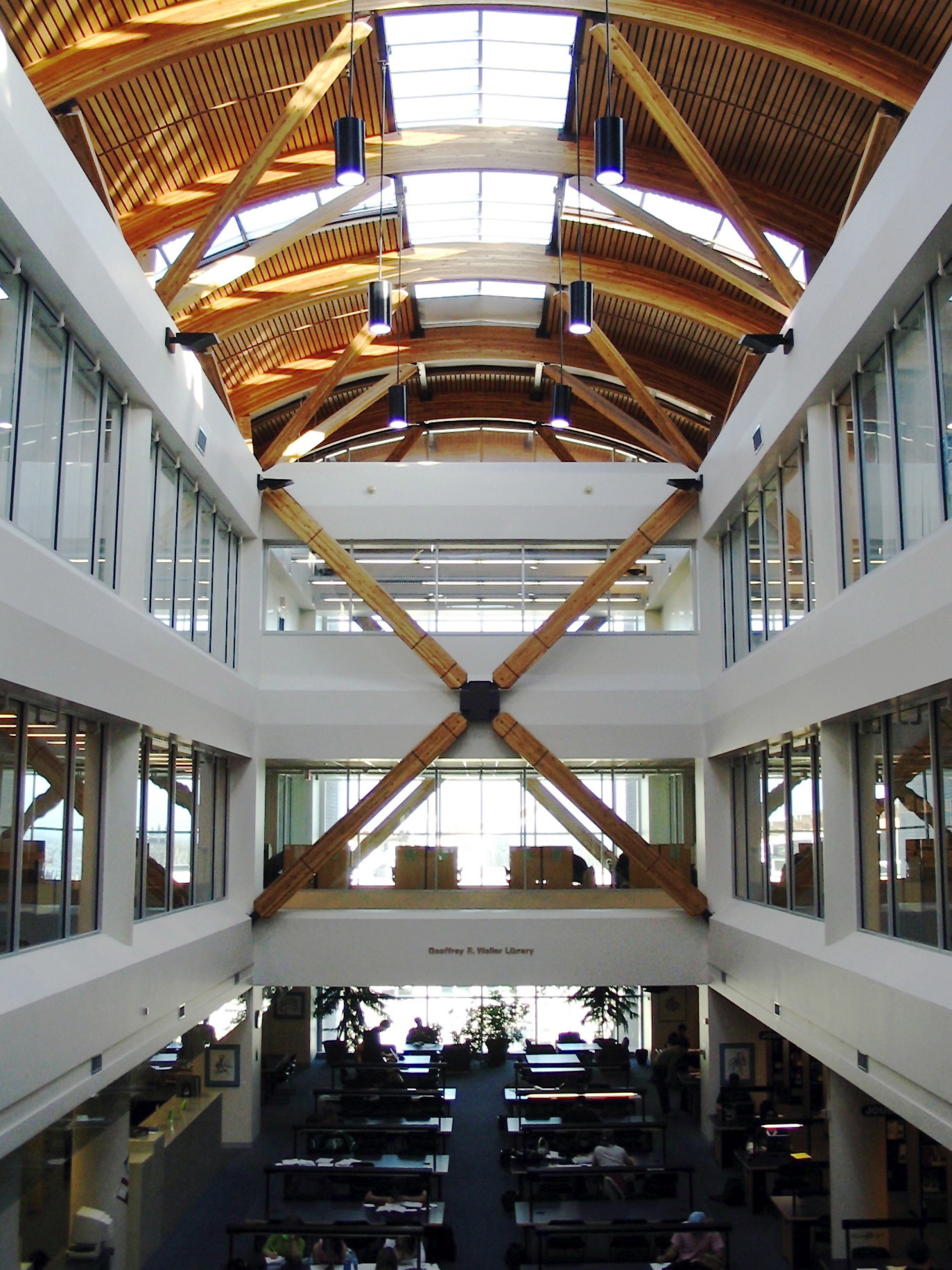
Geoffrey R. Weller Library

== Arms ==
Coat of arms of the University of Northern British Columbia
Notes Granted 21 March 1994 Crest Rising from a circlet of maple leaves snowflakes and dogwood flowers set alternately all Argent a wave Azure leaping therefrom a salmon as styled by Ron Sebastian. Escutcheon Vert a coniferous tree eradicated Or on a chief also Or an open book proper bound Sable between two ravens respectant also Sable. Supporters Upon a compartment rising above barry wavy Argent and Azure charged with a killer whale as styled by Ron Sebastian per pale dexter a forest Vert beneath mountain peaks Argent sinister a field of ears of grain Or embellished Vert dexter a female kermodei bear (Ursus americanus kermodei) Or chested Argent gorged with a collar of conifer branches Vert fructed Or sinister a woodland caribou buck (Rangifer tarandus caribou) Or gorged with a like collar. A banner of the Arms the three sides of the fly bordered Vert and Or. Motto EN CHA HUNÁ (Respecting All Forms Of Life) Badge A sun in splendour Argent charged with a stellar jay (Cyanocitta stelleri) wings displayed Azure.

== Notable alumni ==
- Robin Austin, businessman and former politician
- Shirley Bond, politician
- Kady Dandeneau, wheelchair basketball player
- Currie Dixon, 12th premier of Yukon
- Jocelyn Joe-Strack, Aishihik microbiologist, and hydrologist
- James Moore, politician
- Lynda Price, Dakehl chief of the Ulkatcho First Nation
- Rheanna Robinson, Métis professor
- Sonya Salomaa, actress
- Steph St. Laurent, documentary filmmaker

== See also ==
- Education in Canada
- Higher education in British Columbia
- List of universities in British Columbia
