= Adyghe grammar =

Grammar of the Adyghe language

Adyghe is a polysynthetic language from the Circassian language subdivision, with an ergative verb-final clause structure and rich verb morphology.

== Ergative–absolutive ==
Unlike the majority of languages in the world which follow nominative–accusative alignment, Adyghe follows ergative–absolutive alignment.

The distinction between syntactic cases is crucial for understanding who is doing the action and to whom. Nouns in Adyghe take the following case roles in a sentence depending on the verb's transitivity:

- Absolutive case: Marked with the suffix -р /-r/. It indicates the subject of an intransitive verb or the direct object of a transitive verb.
- Ergative case: Marked with the suffix -м /-m/. It indicates the subject (agent) of a transitive verb.
- Oblique case: Also marked with the suffix -м /-m/. It marks the target of the action in bivalent intransitive verbs, functions as the indirect object (dative) in ditransitive verbs, and acts as a locative argument in transitive verbs with prepositional prefixes.

The following basic example demonstrates this ergative–absolutive case marking system:

Sentence:	Ӏанэр мэкъутэ.		ЛӀым Ӏанэр екъутэ.		
Word:	Ӏанэ-р	мэкъутэ	ЛӀым	Ӏанэр	екъутэ
Gloss:	The table-ABS	breaks	The man-ERG	the table-ABS	breaks
Function:	S	VERB_{intrans}	A	O	VERB_{trans}
Translation:	"The table breaks."		"The man breaks the table."		

Here, "table" has the absolutive case mark -р /-r/ while "man" has the ergative case mark -м /-m/. We also have the verb "break" in intransitive form "мэкъутэ" and transitive form "екъутэ". The example above specifically used SOV (Subject-Object-Verb) order, but Circassian allows any word order.

== Nouns ==
Adyghe nouns inflect for number, case, and definiteness. The plural suffix is -хэ (унэ "house" → унэхэр "houses"), though plural meaning is often carried by the verb instead. Collective nouns such as жылэ "village" and унагъо "family" act as a plurale tantum: they take no plural suffix but trigger plural agreement elsewhere. A definite noun carries a case marker, while an indefinite one is usually unmarked (кӀалэ "a boy" vs. кӀалэр "the boy").

As an ergative–absolutive language, Adyghe declines nouns in four cases:

Case	Suffix	Example
Absolutive	-р	кӀалэр "the boy" (intransitive subject; transitive object)
Ergative–Oblique	-м	кӀалэм "the boy's" / "to the boy" (transitive subject, possessor, indirect object, location)
Instrumental–directional	-(м)кӀэ	къэлэмымкӀэ "with the pencil" (means or direction)
Adverbial	-эу / -у	кӀалэу "as a boy" (turns the noun into a modifier)

The third-person pronouns double as demonstratives and use suppletive forms rather than the regular suffixes: ар / ахэр (absolutive) and ащ / ахэм (ergative–oblique).

When a noun is followed by an adjective, the case suffix attaches to the adjective rather than the noun (пшъэшъэ дахэр "the pretty girl"). Possession is shown with the prefix и- on the possessed noun (икӀалэ "his/her boy"), and adjectives can become abstract nouns with -агъэ (дахэ "pretty" → дахагъэ "beauty"). New nouns are also formed by compounding and by productive suffixes such as -пӀэ "place" (еджапӀэ "school") and -кӀо "agent" (еджакӀо "student"). Adyghe is a pro-drop language, or "pronoun dropping" language, so subject and object pronouns are often omitted because the verb marks person and number.

== Possession ==
Possession is a key grammatical feature in Adyghe. Nouns are divided into two distinct categories based on the relationship between the possessor and the possessed:

- Inalienable (Organic) possession: Used for things that cannot be separated from the possessor (body parts, family, intrinsic positions).
- Alienable (Proprietary) possession: Used for transferable property, objects, and concepts.

=== Inalienable possession ===
Inalienable possession is marked by a specific set of prefixes attached directly to the noun stem. This category strictly includes:

- Body parts: e.g., head, heart, leg, soul.
- Kinship terms: e.g., mother, brother, daughter.
- Name: ыцӀэ
- Part-whole and Spatial relations: Positional words are treated as "body parts" of an object.
  - ычӀэгъ "its under / underside"
  - ыкӀоцӀ "its inside"
  - ыкӀыб "its back / behind"
  - ыпэ "its nose / front"
  - ынакъо "its half"

Person	Singular Possessor		Plural Possessor	
Person	Prefix	Example	Prefix	Example
1st	с- / сы-	с-шъхьэ "my head" сы-гу "my heart"	т- / ты-	ты-нэхэр "our eyes" т-шъхьэхэр "our heads" т-Ӏэжъуамбэхэр "our toes/nails"
2nd	п- / у-	п-лъакъо "your leg" у-нэ "your eye" п-Ӏэ "your hand"	шъу-	шъу-лъакъохэр "your legs" шъу-шъхьацыхэр "your hair"
3rd	ы-	ы-шы "his/her brother" ы-пхъу "his/her daughter" ы-къу "his/her son"	а-	а-гу "their hearts" а-лъакъо "their legs"

=== Alienable possession ===
Alienable possession is used for separable items, such as property, animals, concepts, and material objects. These prefixes differ from the inalienable ones, typically involving the additional vowel -и- (-i-).

Person	Singular Possessor		Plural Possessor	
Person	Prefix	Example	Prefix	Example
1st	си-	си-тхылъ "my book"	ти-	ти-ун "our home"
2nd	уи-	уи-тхылъ "your book"	шъуи-	шъуи-ун "your home"
3rd	и-	и-тхылъ "his/her book"	я-	я-ун "their home"

== Pronouns ==
In Adyghe, pronouns are categorized into the following groups: personal, demonstrative, possessive, interrogative, determinative/reflexive, and indefinite.

=== Personal pronouns ===
Strictly speaking, personal pronouns exist only for the first and second persons.

- 1st Person: сэ "I" (Singular), тэ "we" (Plural).
- 2nd Person: о "you" (Singular), шъо "you" (Plural).

To express the third person ("he", "she", "it", "they"), Adyghe uses demonstrative pronouns (see below).

Unlike nouns, 1st and 2nd person pronouns do not distinguish between the absolutive and ergative cases. These two cases merge into a common form.

Case	First-person		Second-person	
Case	Singular (I)	Plural (We)	Singular (You)	Plural (You)
Absolutive / Ergative	сэ [sa]	тэ [ta]	о [wa]	шъо [ʃʷa]
Instrumental	сэркӀэ [sart͡ʃʼa]	тэркӀэ [tart͡ʃʼa]	оркӀэ [wart͡ʃʼa]	шъоркӀэ [ʃʷart͡ʃʼa]
Adverbial	сэрэу [saraw]	тэрэу [taraw]	орэу [waraw]	шъорэу [ʃʷaraw]

Examples of usage:

- Subject: Сэ седжэ – "I read / I am studying."
- Subject (Transitive): О уеджэ тхылъым – "You are reading the book."
- Subject (Intransitive): Тэ тэкӀо еджапӀэм – "We are going to school."
- Subject (Plural): Шъо Ӏоф шъошӀэ – "You (plural) are working."
- Indirect Object/Beneficiary: СэркӀэ мы Ӏофы́р къины – "This job is hard for me."

=== Demonstrative pronouns ===
Demonstrative pronouns are used to point to objects and also function as 3rd person pronouns. They are distinguished by distance:

- Proximal (This): мы – Used for objects close to the speaker.
- Distal (That): мо – Used for objects far from the speaker.
- Neutral (That): а – Used for objects regardless of distance (or invisible/abstract).

Examples:

- Мы унэм нахьи мо унакӀэу къашӀырэр нахь дах – "This house (close) is more beautiful than that house (far) which is being built."
- А тхылъэ́у пщэфыгъэм сегъэплъыба – "Show me that book you bought."

Unlike personal pronouns, demonstrative pronouns do distinguish cases.

Case	Proximal (This)	Distal (That)	Neutral (That/He/She)
Absolutive	мыр	мор	ар
Ergative / Oblique	мыщ	мощ	ащ
Instrumental	мыщкӀэ	мощкӀэ	ащкӀэ
Adverbial	мырэу	морэу	арэу

The plural forms are created using the -хэ- suffix:

- Absolutive: мыхэр (These), ахэр (Those/They).
- Ergative/Oblique: мыхэм, ахэм.

=== Possessive pronouns ===
Independent possessive pronouns express ownership ("Mine", "Yours", "Theirs"). These differ from the possessive prefixes (си-, уи-, etc.) attached to nouns.

- сэсый – "mine"
- оуий – "yours"
- ий – "his / hers / its"
- тэтый – "ours"
- шъошъуй – "yours" (plural)
- яй – "theirs"

Usage examples:

- Мы унэр сэсый – "This house is mine."
- Мы чъыгхэр тэтыех – "These trees are ours."

=== Interrogative pronouns ===
Interrogative pronouns are used to ask questions.

- хэт (or хэта) – "who?" (used for humans)
- сыд (or сыда) – "what?" (used for non-humans/things)
- тхьапш – "how much / how many?"
- тары – "which?"
- сыдигъу – "when?"
- тыдэ – "where?"
- сыд фэд – "what kind of?"

Examples:

- Хэт зыӀуагъэр? – "Who said that?"
- Хэт унэм къихьагъэр? – "Who entered the house?"
- Сыд плъэгъугъа? – Хьэ слъэгъугъэ. — "What did you see?" – "I saw a dog."
- Сыд къэпхьыгъэр? – "What did you bring?"

=== Determinative and reflexive pronouns ===
This group includes reflexive pronouns ("self") and quantifiers ("all", "every").

- ежь – "self"
- зэкӀэ – "all"
- шъхьадж – "every / each"
- ышъхьэкӀэ – "personally / himself"
- хэти, хэтрэ́ – "everyone", "any (person)"
- сыди, сыдрэ́ – "everything", "any (thing)"

Examples:

- Хэти зышъхьамысыжьэу Ӏоф ышӀэн фае – "Everyone must work without pitying himself."
- Сыдрэ Ӏофри дэгъу, угу къыбдеӀэу бгъэцакӀэмэ – "Any job is good if done with a full heart."

=== Indefinite pronouns ===
The primary indefinite pronoun in Adyghe is зыгорэ, which corresponds to "someone", "something", "some", or "one". It declines like a noun.

Case	Singular	Plural
Absolutive	зыгорэ [zəɡʷara]	зыгорэхэр [zəɡʷaraxar]
Ergative / Oblique	зыгорэм [zəɡʷaram]	зыгорэхэмэ [zəɡʷaraxama]
Instrumental	зыгорэ(м)кӀэ [zəɡʷara(m)t͡ʃʼa]	зыгорэхэ(м)кӀэ [zəɡʷaraxa(m)t͡ʃʼa]
Adverbial	зыгорэу [zəɡʷaraw]	зыгорэхэу [zəɡʷaraxaw]

Usage examples:

- Зыгорэ пчъэм къытеуагъ – "Someone knocked on the door."
- А тхылъ гъэшӀэгъоным зыгорэ къытегущыӀэгъагъ – "Someone spoke about this interesting book."

== Adjectives ==
Adyghe adjectives are morphologically close to nouns and share their number and case markers. The defining feature is phrase-final affixation: when an adjective modifies a noun, the noun stays in its bare stem and the markers for number (-хэ) and case attach to the end of the whole phrase – normally to the adjective (пшъэшъэ дахэр "the beautiful girl", пшъэшъэ дахэхэр "the beautiful girls").

The same holds for adjectives that behave as suffixes, such as the augmentative -шхо "big" (унэшхохэр "the big houses"). Qualitative adjectives ("good", "tall") follow the noun, while relative or material adjectives ("iron", "wooden") precede it and do not inflect (гъучӀ пӀэкӀорыр "the iron bed"). Used on its own, an adjective declines like a noun through all four cases (фыжьыр "the white one", фыжьым "of/to the white one").

Degree is expressed analytically: the comparative with the particle нахь "more" (Ар ощ нахь лъагэ "He is taller than you") and the superlative with анахь "most" (Ар пшъашъэмэ анахь дахэ "She is the most beautiful of the girls"). Size and age are marked by suffixes on the noun (унакӀэ "new house", унэжъы "old house", унэцӀыкӀу "small house"), while a range of suffixes modify the degree of a quality:

Meaning	Suffix	Example
very	-дэд	дэгъудэд "very good"
slightly	-Ӏо	дыджыӀо "slightly bitter"
too much	-щэ	дыджыщэ "too bitter"
quite	-кӀай	дэгъукӀай "quite good"
lacking	-нчъэ	акъылынчъэ "mindless"

Adjectives also feed productive derivation. The suffix -гъэ turns them into abstract nouns of measure (кӀыхьэ "long" → кӀыхьагъэ "length"; дахэ "beautiful" → дэхагъэ "beauty"), while -гъакӀэ forms nouns for the state or essence of a quality (дэхэгъакӀэ "(inherent) prettiness"). The prefix шӀо- forms psychological predicates meaning "X is [adjective] to someone" (дахэ "beautiful" → шӀодах "it is beautiful to him/her").

== Adverbs ==
In the Adyghe language, adverbs are categorized into four main groups: adverbs of place, adverbs of time, adverbs of quality (manner), and adverbs of amount (quantity).

=== Adverbs of Place ===
These adverbs indicate location or direction.

Adverb	Meaning	Nuance
мыдэ	"here"	Near the speaker.
модэ	"there"	Visible to the speaker.
адэ	"there"	Invisible or far from the speaker.

Examples
Sentence	Gloss	Function	Translation
МодэкӀэ тучаныр Ӏут.	there-INS shop-ABS stands	S VERB	"The shop is standing over there."
Адэ кӀалэр кӀуагъэ.	there boy-ABS went	S VERB	"The boy went there."

=== Adverbs of Time ===
These adverbs indicate when an action takes place.

Category	Adverb	Translation
Days	непэ	"today"
Days	тыгъуасэ	"yesterday"
Days	тыгъуасэнахьыпэ	"the day before yesterday"
Days	неущы	"tomorrow"
Days	неущмыкӀэ	"the day after tomorrow"
Days	непенэу	"all day long"
Years	гъэрекӀо	"last year"
Years	мыгъэ	"this year"
Years	къакӀорэгъэ	"next year"
Present / Now	джы	"now"
Present / Now	джырэкӀэ	"for now"
Present / Now	джыкӀэ	"so far"
Present / Now	джыдэдэм	"right now"
Present / Now	джынэс	"until now"
Present / Now	джыри	"still" / "again"
Times of Day	пчэдыжьым	"in the morning"
Times of Day	щэджагъом	"at noon"
Times of Day	щэджэгъоужым	"in the afternoon"
Times of Day	пчыхьэм	"in the evening"
Times of Day	чэщым	"in the night"
Relative Time	зэманым	"in the past"
Relative Time	тӀэкӀушӀэмэ	"soon" (lit: in a little while)
Relative Time	бэшӀэмэ	"later" (lit: in a long while)
Relative Time	тӀэкӀушӀагъэу	"recently"
Relative Time	бэшӀагъэу	"long time ago"
Sequence / Frequency	пэтырэу	"while"
Sequence / Frequency	етӀанэ (етӀуанэ)	"afterwards"
Sequence / Frequency	пасэу	"early"
Sequence / Frequency	кӀасэу	"lately / late"
Sequence / Frequency	ренэу	"always"

Examples
Sentence	Gloss	Function	Translation
ТӀэкӀушӀэмэ тышхэнэу тыкӀощт.	soon we-eat-PURP we-go-FUT	S VERB	"Soon we will go to eat."
Непэ пасэу еджапӀэм тынэсышъугъ.	today early school-OBL we-reach-POT-PST	S IO VERB	"Today we managed to reach school early."

=== Adverbs of Amount (Quantity) ===
These adverbs indicate the degree or quantity of the action or quality.

Adverb	Translation
макӀэ	"few"
тӀэкӀу	"a bit"
тӀэкӀурэ	"few times / for a short period"
бэ	"a lot"
бэрэ	"a lot of times / for a long period"
Ӏаджэ	"many"
хъои	"plenty"
апӀэ	"load of"
заулэ	"several"
сыдэу	"so / how (intensifier)"

Examples
Sentence	Gloss	Translation
Шхыныр сыдэу фабэ.	food-ABS so hot	"The food is so hot."
КӀалэм ахъщэ бэ иӀ.	boy-OBL money much has	"The boy has a lot of money."
Чэщым лӀыр тӀэкӀурэ макӀо.	night-OBL man-ABS little-time goes	"In the night, the man goes for a short while."

=== Adverbs of Quality (Manner) ===
Adverbs of manner describe how an action is performed. They are productively formed from qualitative adjectives using the adverbial case suffix ~эу (/~aw/).

Adjective	Translation	Adverb (Suffix -эу)	Translation
къабзэ	"clean"	къабзэу	"cleanly"
чыжьэ	"far"	чыжьэу	"far"
псынкӀэ	"fast/quick"	псынкӀэу	"quickly"
дахэ	"beautiful"	дахэу	"beautifully"
благъэ	"near"	благъэу	"nearly/close"
лъэш	"strong"	лъэшэу	"strongly/powerfully"
шъабэ	"soft"	шъабэу	"softly"
пытэ	"firm"	пытэу	"firmly"

Examples
Sentence	Gloss	Function	Translation
КӀалэр чыжьэу чъагъэ.	boy-ABS far-ADV ran	S VERB	"The boy ran far."
КӀалэм шхыныр дэгъоу ышӀэгъ.	boy-ERG food-ABS good-ADV made	A O VERB	"The boy made the food excellently."
Пшъашъэр дахэу матхэ.	girl-ABS beautiful-ADV writes	S VERB	"The girl writes beautifully."

=== Formation of Adverbs ===
Adverbs can be derived from other parts of speech through several methods:

1. Suffixing (Adverbial Case): Adding ~эу to adjectives.
  - дахэ (beautiful) → дахэу (beautifully)
  - шъабэ (soft) → шъабэу (softly)
  - пытэ (firm) → пытэу (firmly)
2. Concatenating (Compounding): Combining two words.
  - неущ (tomorrow) + пчэдыжь (morning) → неущпчэдыжьы (tomorrow morning)
  - щэджагъу (noon) + уж (after) → щэджэгъоужым (afternoon)
3. Conversion (Fossilized Cases): Nouns fixed in a specific case functioning as adverbs.
  - пчыхьэм (evening-ERG/OBL) → "in the evening"
  - лӀыгъэкӀэ (courage-INS) → "forcibly/bravely"

Usage examples
Sentence	Translation
Сэ дэгъоу сэ́джэ.	"I study well."
ЛэжьакӀохэр пчэдыжьым жьэ́у къэтэджых.	"Workers get up early in the morning."

=== Contradiction (Rather/Actually) ===
The word нахь (/naːħ/) functions as an adversative adverb meaning "rather" or "actually." It is used to correct a statement or introduce a contrast to what the listener might believe.

- кӀуагъэ (he went) → кӀуагъэ нахь (rather, he went)
- къины (hard) → къины нахь (rather, it is hard)
- кӀалэ (boy) → кӀалэ нахь (rather, it is a boy)

Examples
Sentence	Gloss	Translation
КӀалэр кӀуагъэп, чъагъэ нахь.	boy-ABS went-NEG, ran rather	"The boy didn't walk, rather he ran."
Фылымым теплъыгъэ нахь.	film-OBL we-watched rather	"We actually watched the film."

== Conjunctions ==
In English, the word "and" is used to connect various parts of speech. In Adyghe, there are different ways (suffixes) to connect words depending on their part of speech and definiteness.

Category	Suffix	Example	Translation
Indefinite nouns	-рэ /ra/	КӀалэ-рэ пшъашъэ-рэ къэкӀуагъэх.	"A boy and a girl came."
Definite nouns	-мрэ /mra/	КӀалэ-мрэ пшъашъэ-мрэ кӀуагъэх.	"The boy and the girl came."
Pronouns	-рэ /ra/	Сэ-рэ о-рэ тыкӀуагъ.	"You and I went."
Indefinite adjectives	-рэ /ra/	КӀэлэ кӀыхьэ-рэ пшъашъэ дахэ-рэ къэкӀуагъэх.	"A tall boy and a pretty girl came."
Definite adjectives	-мрэ /mra/	КӀэлэ кӀыхьэ-мрэ пшъашъэ дахэ-мрэ къэкӀуагъэх.	"The tall boy and the pretty girl came."
Numbers	-рэ /ra/	КӀэлэ тӀу-рэ пшъашъэ щы-рэ къэкӀуагъэх.	"Two boys and three girls came."
Universal nouns	-и /i/	КӀал-и пшъашъ-и къэкӀуагъэх.	"Boys and girls came."
Adverbs	-мкӀи /mt͡ʃʼi/	Мафэ-мкӀи чэщы-мкӀи къэкӀуагъэх.	"They came in the day and in the night."

The independent conjunction ыкӀи /ət͡ʃəj/ ("and") can also be used to connect different parts of speech.

- Verbs: КӀалэр еджэ ыкӀи матхэ. – "The boy reads and writes."
- Adjectives: КӀалэр дахэ ыкӀи кӀыхьэ. – "The boy is handsome and tall."

Conjunctions in the Circassian language play the same role as conjunctions in English; they are used to connect together, in different ways, words or parts of a difficult sentence. According to the structure of Circassian conjunctions, they can be separated into two groups: simple and complex.

=== Simple conjunctions ===
Among simple Circassian conjunctions are:

- ыкӀи – "and"
- е – "or"
- ау – "but"

Сэ скӀуагъ къалэм, ау къэзгъэзэжьыгъэп
[sa skʷʼaːʁ qaːɮam aːw qazʁazaʑəʁap]
I {I went} city.ERG but {I didn't return}
"I went to the city, but I haven't returned."

Сэ непенэу сэлажьэ ыкӀи сычъыягъэп тыгъуасэ чэщым
[sa najpajnaw saɮaːʑa ət͡ʃʼəj sət͡ʂaːʁap təʁʷaːsa t͡ʃaʃə]
I {this whole day} {I am working} and {I haven't slept} yesterday {in the night.ERG}
"I have been working this whole day and I haven't slept yesterday night."

=== Complex conjunctions ===
- ау щытми – "however"
- ары шъхьай – "but"
- ащ шъхьакӀэ – "however"
- ары пакӀопышъ – "not only", "but"
- арти – "so"
- армэ (аущтэумэ) – "if so"
- арми (аущтэуми) – "even if so"
- армырмэ – "if not, else, otherwise"
- армырми – "even if not, either way"
- нахь мышӀэми – "despite"
- зэ-зэ – "here-and-there"
- е-е – "either-or"
- сыда пӀомэ – "because"
- ащ къыхэкӀыкӀэ – "due to"
- сыдигъокӀи – "in any case"
- сыдми – "either way"

унэм тигъэс, {сыда пӀомэ} непэ къещхыщт
[wənam təjʁas {sədaː pʔʷʼama} najpa qajɕxəɕt]
house.ERG {let us stay inside} because today {it will rain}
"Let us stay inside the house, because today it will rain."

армэ, неущы къычӀегъэдзагъэу седжэу сыублэщт экзамыным фэшӀыкӀэ
[aːrma najwɕə qət͡ʂʼajʁad͡zaːʁaw sajd͡ʒaw səwbɮaɕt akzaːmənəm faʃʼət͡ʃʼa]
{if that so} tomorrow {starting from} studying.ADV {I will start} exam.ERG for
"If that so, I will start studying for the exam starting from tomorrow."

== Particles ==
Particles in the Circassian language vary in both meaning and structure. Semantically, they are categorized into groups such as affirmative, negative, interrogative, intensive, indicatory, and stimulating.

Category	Particle	Translation
Affirmative	ары	"yes"
Affirmative	хъун, хъущт	"fine", "OK"
Affirmative	адэ	"of course" (expresses confidence)
Negative	хьау	"no"
Interrogative	шӀуа	"perhaps", "I wonder"
Intensive	адэ	"well"
Intensive	кӀо	"well", "so"
Indicatory	мары	"this is it"
Indicatory	моры	"that is it"
Stimulating	еу	"come on"

=== Usage Examples ===
Affirmative

- Непэ тадэжь къакӀоба. – Хъун. — "– Come to us today." "– OK."
- КъэсӀуагъэр къыбгурыӀуагъа? – Ары. — "– Have you understood what I have said?" "– Yes."
- Адэ, непэ тыдэкӀыни тыкъэшхэщт. — "Certainly, we will go out today and eat."

Negative

- Хьау, хьау, зыми сэ сыфаеп. – "No, no, I don't want a thing."

Interrogative

- Сыдигъо шӀуа автобусыр къызыкӀощтыр? – "When perhaps will the bus come?"

Intensive

- Адэ, Пщымаф, гущыӀэу птыгъэр пгъэцэкӀэжьын фай. – "Well, Pshimaf, you must keep your word."
- КӀо, кӀалэр еджэн фаи къытдэкӀышъугъэп. – "Well, because the boy needs to study he couldn't come out with us."

Indicatory

- Мары машинэу зигугъу къыпфэсшӀыгъагъэр. – "This is the car which I have told you about."

Stimulating

- Еу, псынкӀэу зегъахь! – "Come on, get out of here quickly!"

Other interjections and fillers
Particle	Function	Example	Translation
ашъыу	Self-correction ("er", "I mean")	Уатэр къэсфэхь, Ашъыу, отычэр къэсфэхь.	"Bring me the hammer, er, I mean, bring me the axe."
ашъыу	Annoyance ("argh", "ugh")	Ашъыу!, зэ щыгъэт.	"Ugh! Shut up for a moment."
хъугъэ	Giving up ("that's enough")	Хъугъэ!, некӀо тыкӀожьыщт.	"That's enough! Let's return."
еоой	Lament ("alas")	Еоой, идж сыд цӀыфым ышӀэжьыщтэр?	"Alas, what will the person do now?"

== Demonstratives ==
Adyghe has a four-way demonstrative system based on distance and visibility, plus an interrogative form.

Stem	IPA	Translation	Nuance / Usage	Examples
мы	/mə/	this	Refers to a referent close to both the speaker and the listener.	мы Ӏанэ – this table мы мэгъэ – this year
мо	/maw/	that	Refers to a referent that is visible and at a known distance.	мо пшъашъэ – that girl мо кӀалэр – that boy
а	/aː/	that / yon	Refers to a referent far away and invisible to both parties.	а Ӏанэ – yon table а кӀалэм еӀо – yon boy says
джэ	/d͡ʒa/	that (emphatic)	Refers to an invisible referent already established in the conversation.	джэ пшъашъэ – that girl (mentioned before) джэ кӀалэр – that boy
тэ	/ta/	which	Interrogative form used for questioning.	тэ Ӏанэ? – which table? тэ пшъашъэ? – which girl?

=== Derived Adverbial Forms ===
Demonstrative stems combine with various suffixes to form adverbs and pronouns related to location, manner, and time.

Category	Root: мы (This)	Root: мо (That, vis.)	Root: а (That, invis.)	Root: джэ (That, ref.)	Root: тэ (Which/Inter.)
Location	мыдэ (here)	модэ (there)	адэ (yonder)	–	тэдэ (where?)
Area	мыу (here)	моу (there)	ау (yonder)	джэу (there)	тэу (where?)
Similarity	мыщфэд (like this)	мощфэд (like that)	ащфэд (like that)	–	тэщфэд (like what?)
Action / Manner	мыущтэу (like this)	моущтэу (like that)	аущтэу (like that)	джэущтэу (like that)	тэущтэу (how?)
Time	мыщыгъум (now)	–	ащыгъум (then)	–	тэщыгъум (at what time?)
Indicatory	мары (this one)	моры (that one)	ары (yon one)	джэры (that one)	тэры (which one?)

== Postpositions ==
In the Circassian language, as well as in other Ibero-Caucasian languages, the role of prepositions belongs to postpositions. It is difficult to define the exact count of postpositions in the Circassian language, because even such major parts of speech as nouns (from the point of view of their functionality) sometimes can be included into the group, together with some verb prefixes.

For example, in the sentence Тхылъыр столым телъ ("The book is lying on the table") the noun has no preposition, but the meaning remains clear because in the verb те-лъ ("is lying") the prefix те- expresses something's being on a surface, so this form of the verb literally means "on the surface is lying".

Nouns and adverbs sometimes play the role of postpositions. For example, nouns that describe different parts of the human body (head, nose, side, etc.) sometimes function as postpositions. In the sentence, Шъузыр лӀым ыпэ итэу кӀощтыгъэ ("The wife was going in front of the husband"), the preposition "in front of" in the Circassian sentence is expressed by the phrase ыпэ итэу ("being in front of his nose").

Nouns and pronouns combine with a postposition in the ergative grammatical case only. For example, the postposition дэжь ("near, beside") requires a word in the ergative case:

- чъыгы-м дэжь – "near the tree"
- ныбджэгъу-м пае – "for the friend"

Postpositions can attach possessive prefixes to themselves. For example, in singular:

- сэ с-а-дэжь – "near me"
- о у-а-дэжь – "near you"
- ащ ы-дэжь – "near him"

In plural:

- тэ т-а-дэжь – "near us"
- шъо шъу-а-дэжь – "near you"
- ахэмэ а-дэжь – "near them"

The following words are used as postpositions in the Circassian language:

- дэжь – "near"
- пае – "for"
- пашъхьэ – "in front of, before"
- чӀэгъ – "under"
- шъхьагъ – "above"
- фэдэу – "like, similar"
- азыфагу – "between"
- гузэгу – "middle"
- бгъу – "side"
- гупэ – "face"
- кӀыб – "back"
- къогъу – "corner"
- кӀыӀу – "surface"
- кӀоцӀы – "inside"
- пэ – "nose"
- пшъэ – "neck"
- ужы – "trace"
- нэуж – "track"
- чӀыпӀэ – "place"

== Interrogatives ==
The suffix ~a /aː/ initials the interrogative particle that indicates a yes-or-no question. For example:

- макӀо "(s)he is going" → макӀуа? "Is (s)he going?"
- кӀалэ "boy" → кӀала? "Is it a boy?"
- дахэ "beautiful" → даха? "Is (s)he beautiful?"
- КӀала Ӏаным тесыр? – "Is it a boy that sits on the table?"
- КӀалэр Ӏаным теса? – "Is the boy sits on the table?"
- КӀалэр Ӏана зытесыр? – "Is it a table the boy is sits on?"

If a question is posited to word having the negative suffix ~п (~p), it is converted to suffix ~ба (~baː). The suffix ~ба /ba initials the negative interrogative particle. For example:

- макӀо "(s)he is going" → макӀо-ба? "Isn't (s)he is going?"
- кӀалэ "boy" → кӀалэ-ба? "Isn't it a boy?"
- дахэ "beautiful" → дахэ-ба? "Isn't (s)he beautiful?"
- КӀалэба Ӏаным тесыр? – "Isn't it a boy that sits on the table?"
- КӀалэр Ӏаным тесыба? – "Isn't the boy sits on the table?"
- КӀалэр Ӏанэба зытесыр? – "Isn't it a table the boy is sits on?"

If question is posited by auxiliary interrogative words:

- хэт (хэта) – "who"
- сыд (шъыд) – "what/which"
- сыда (шъыда) – "why"
- тыдэ – "where"
- тхьэпш – "how much"
- сыд фэдиз – "how much"
- тэущтэу (сыдэущтэу) – "how"
- тары – "which"
- сыдигъу (шъыдгъо) – "when"
- сыдкӀэ (шъыдкӀэ) – "with what"
- сыд фэд? – "what kind of?"

хэт къэкӀуагъэ?
[xat qakʷʼaːʁa]
who {the person that came}
"Who came?"

сыд кӀалэм ыцӀэ?
[səd t͡ʃʼaːɮam ət͡sʼa]
what {the boy.ERG} {his name}
"What is the boy's name?"

непэ тыдэ ущыӀэщт?
[najpa təda wɕəʔaɕt]
today where {you will be there}
"Today where will you be?"

== Syntax ==
Order of words in a Circassian sentence is, generally, free, but the situation where verb goes at the end is the most typical.

- Трактористыр пасэу къэтэджыгъ – "The tractor-driver got up early."

The structure of a full sentence is, usually, defined by its form of verb. In the Circassian language, there are the following types of sentences:

- Nominative sentence, where the subject is in the absolutive grammatical case, verb is intransitive, and there is no direct object:
  - Гъатхэ́р къэсыгъ, чъыгхэр къызэӀуихыхэу ригъэжъагъ – "Spring has come, the trees have started to bloom."
- Ergative sentence, where the subject is in ergative case, direct object is in absolutive case, and the verb is transitive:
  - Агрономым губгъохэ́р къыплъахьыгъэх – "The agronomist has reviewed the fields."
- Sentence where subject is in zero form. In this type of sentences both transitive and intransitive verbs can be used:
  - Нанэ тхъу къыситыгъ – "Mother gave me some butter";
  - КӀэлэ тэрэз ащ фэдэу псэурэ́п – "A good guy does not behave like that."
    - These types of Circassian sentences are rarer than the first two.

In the Circassian language, there are compound sentences that can consist both of independent parts only, and of the main part in combination with dependent subparts.

Compound sentences with independent parts:

- Нэф къэшъыгъ, ау цӀыфхэр джыри урамхэм къатехьагъэхэ́п – "The morning has already come, but the people have not appeared on the streets yet."
- ЗэкӀэ́ къалэ́м къикӀыжьыгъэх, ау ежь Ибрахьимэ Ӏофхэр иӀэу къэуцугъ – "Everybody has returned from the city, but Ibrahim has stayed because of his affairs."

Compound sentences with dependent parts are structurally different. The most typical Circassian compound sentence with a dependent part is the sentence where its dependent part expresses some sort of circumstances explaining the main part:

- Мэзэ́ псау́м ащ Ӏоф ышӀагъэ́п, сыда пӀомэ дэсыгъэпы́шъ ары́ – "He has not worked for the whole month, because he has been away."

== Number ==
Numbers from zero to ten are specific words:

0 – зиӀ [ziʔ]
1 – зы [zə]
2 – тӀу [tʷʼə]
3 – щы [ɕə]
4 – плӀы [pɬʼə]
5 – тфы [tfə]
6 – хы [xə]
7 – блы [blə] or [bɮə]
8 – и [jə]
9 – бгъу [bʁʷə]
10 – пшӀы [pʃʼə]

Numbers from eleven to nineteen are built with the word for ten, followed by кӀу ([kʷʼə]) and the unit digit:

11 – пшӀыкӀуз [pʃʼəkʷʼəz]
12 – пшӀыкӀутӀу [pʃʼəkʷʼətʷʼ]
13 – пшӀыкӀущ [pʃʼəkʷʼəɕ]
14 – пшӀыкӀуплӀ [pʃʼəkʷʼəpɬʼ]
15 – пшӀыкӀутф [pʃʼəkʷʼətf]
16 – пшӀыкӀух [pʃʼəkʷʼəx]
17 – пшӀыкӀубл [pʃʼəkʷʼəbl]
18 – пшӀыкӀуй [pʃʼəkʷʼəj]
19 – пшӀыкӀубгъу [pʃʼəkʷʼəbʁʷ]

The tens follow a vigesimal system from forty up, with the exception of fifty:

20 – тӀокӀы [tʷʼat͡ʃə] (20)
21 – тӀокӀырэ зырэ [tʷʼat͡ʃəra zəra] (20 and 1)
22 – тӀокӀырэ тӀурэ [tʷʼat͡ʃəra tʷʼəra] (20 and 2)
23 – тӀокӀырэ щырэ [tʷʼat͡ʃəra ɕəra] (20 and 3)
...
30 – щэкӀы [ɕat͡ʃə] (30)
31 – щэкӀырэ зырэ [ɕat͡ʃə zəra] (30 and 1)
32 – щэкӀырэ тӀурэ [ɕat͡ʃə tʷʼəra] (30 and 2)
...
40 – тӀокӀитӀу [tʷʼat͡ʃitʷʼ] (20 × 2)
41 – тӀокӀитӀурэ зырэ [tʷʼat͡ʃitʷʼəra zəra] (20 × 2 and 1)
42 – тӀокӀитӀурэ тӀурэ [tʷʼat͡ʃitʷʼəra tʷʼəra] (20 × 2 and 2)
...
50 – шъэныкъо [ʂanəqʷa] (half-hundred)
51 – шъэныкъорэ зырэ [ʂanəqʷara zəra] (half-hundred and 1)
52 – шъэныкъорэ тӀурэ [ʂanəqʷara tʷʼəra] (half-hundred and 2)
...
60 – тӀокӀищ [tʷʼat͡ʃiɕ] (20 × 3)
61 – тӀокӀищырэ зырэ [tʷʼat͡ʃiɕəra zəra] (20 × 3 and 1)
62 – тӀокӀищырэ тӀурэ [tʷʼat͡ʃiɕəra tʷʼəra] (20 × 3 and 2)
...
70 – тӀокӀищырэ пшӀырэ [tʷʼat͡ʃiɕra pʃʼəra] (20 × 3 and 10)
71 – тӀокӀищырэ пшӀыкӀузырэ [tʷʼat͡ʃiɕra pʃʼəkʷʼəzəra] (20 × 3 and 11)
72 – тӀокӀищырэ пшӀыкӀутӀурэ [tʷʼat͡ʃiɕra pʃʼəkʷʼətʷʼəra] (20 × 3 and 12)
...
80 – тӀокӀиплӀ [tʷʼat͡ʃipɬʼ] (20 × 4)
81 – тӀокӀиплӀырэ зырэ [tʷʼat͡ʃipɬʼəra zəra] (20 × 4 and 1)
82 – тӀокӀиплӀырэ тӀурэ [tʷʼat͡ʃipɬʼəra tʷʼəra] (20 × 4 and 2)
...
90 – тӀокӀиплӀырэ пшӀырэ [tʷʼat͡ʃipɬʼəra pʃʼəra] (20 × 4 and 10)
91 – тӀокӀиплӀырэ пшӀыкӀузырэ [tʷʼat͡ʃipɬʼəra pʃʼəkʷʼəzəra] (20 × 4 and 11)
91 – тӀокӀиплӀырэ пшӀыкӀутӀурэ [tʷʼat͡ʃipɬʼəra pʃʼəkʷʼətʷʼəra] (20 × 4 and 12)

One hundred is шъэ (ʂa). The hundreds are formed by the hundred word root (шъ (ʂ)) followed by -и- (-i-) and the multiplier digit root.

100 – шъэ [ʂa]
101 – шъэрэ зырэ [ʂara zəra] (100 and 1)
110 – шъэрэ пшӀырэ [ʂara pʃʼəra] (100 and 10)
200 – шъитӀу [ʂitʷʼ] (100 × 2)
201 – шъитӀурэ зырэ [ʂitʷʼəra zəra] (200 × 2 and 1)
300 – шъищ [ʂiɕ] (100 × 3)
400 – шъиплӀ [ʂipɬʼ] (100 × 4)
500 – шъитф [ʂitf] (100 × 5)
600 – шъих [ʂix] (100 × 6)
700 – шъибл [ʂibl] (100 × 7)
800 – шъий [ʂij] (100 × 8)
900 – шъибгъу [ʂibʁʷ] (100 × 9)

One thousand is мин (min). The thousands are formed by the thousand word root (мин [məjn]) followed by -и- (-i-) and the multiplier digit root.

1000 – мин [min]
1001 – минрэ зырэ [minra zəra] (1000 and 1)
1010 – минрэ пшӀырэ [minra pʃʼəra] (1000 and 10)
1100 – минрэ шъэрэ [minra ʂara] (1000 and 100)
2000 – минитӀу [minitʷʼ] (1000 × 2)
3000 – минищ [miniɕ] (1000 × 3)
4000 – миниплӀ [minipɬʼ] (1000 × 4)
5000 – минитф [minitf] (1000 × 5)
6000 – миних [minix] (1000 × 6)
7000 – минибл [minibl] (1000 × 7)
8000 – миний [minij] (1000 × 8)
9000 – минибгъу [minibʁʷ] (1000 × 9)
10000 – минипшӀ [minipʃʼ] (1000 × 10)
11000 – минипшӀыкӀуз [minipʃʼəkʷʼəz] (1000 × 11)
12000 – минипшӀыкӀутӀу [minipʃʼəkʷʼətʷʼ] (1000 × 12)
20000 – минитӀокӀы [minitʷʼat͡ʃə] (1000 × 20)
100000 – минишъэ [miniʂa] (1000 × 100)
200000 – минишъитӀу [miniʂitʷʼ] (1000 × 200)

When composed, the hundred word takes the -рэ (-ra) suffix, as well as the ten and the unit if any:

- шъэрэ зырэ [ʂara zəra] (101)
- шъэрэ тӀурэ [ʂara tʷʼəra] (102)
- шъэрэ пшӀыкӀузырэ [pʃʼəkʷʼətʷʼəra] (111)
- шъитӀурэ щэкӀырэ плӀырэ [ʂitʷʼəra ɕat͡ʃəra pɬʼəra] (234)

One thousand is мин (min). The other thousands are formed by concatenating the thousand word with -и- (-i-) and the multiplier digit root:

- минитӀу [minitʷʼə] (2,000)
- минищ [miniɕ] (3,000)
- минищ шъэ [miniɕ ʂa] (3,100)
- минищ шъитӀу [miniɕ ʂitʷʼə] (3,200)
- миниплӀ [minipɬʼ] (4,000)
- миниплӀы шъэ [minipɬʼəra ʂa] (4,100)
- минишъиплӀтӀу [miniʂipɬʼətʷʼ] (4,200)
- минишъиплӀщ [miniʂipɬʼəɕ] (4,300)
- минитфы шъэ [minitfə ʂa] (5,100)
- минишъитфтӀу [miniʂitfətʷʼ] (5,200)
- ...

When there is a certain amount of the noun, the noun is followed by -и (-i) and the multiplier digit root, for example:

- Зы кӀалэ [zə t͡ʃaːla] – "one boy"
- КӀалитӀу [t͡ʃaːlitʷʼ] – "two boys"
- КӀалиплӀ [t͡ʃaːlipɬʼ] – "four boys"
- КӀалишъэ [t͡ʃaːliʂa] – "100 boys"
- Зы мафэ [zə maːfa] – "one day"
- МафитӀу [maːfitʷʼ] – "two days"
- Мафищы (мафищ) [maːfiɕ] – "three days"

=== Ordinal numbers ===
Ordinal numerals are words that express rank or position in sequential order, such as first, second, third, etc. In Adyghe, except апэрэ/япэрэ ("first"; aːpara/jaːpara), ordinal numbers are formed by the prefix я- (jaː-) and suffix -нэрэ (-nara).

For example:

- first – япэрэ [jaːpara]
- second – ятӀунэрэ [jaːtʷʼənara]
- third – ящынэрэ [jaːɕənara]
- fourth – яплӀынэрэ [jaːpɬʼənara]
- fifth – ятфынэрэ [jaːtfənara]
- sixth – яхынэрэ [jaːxənara]
- seventh – яблынэрэ [jaːblənara]
- eighth – яинэрэ [jaːjənara]
- ninth – ябгъунэрэ [jaːbʁʷənara]
- tenth – япшӀынэрэ [jaːpʃʼənara]
- eleventh – япшӀыкӀузынэрэ [jaːpʃʼəkʷʼəzənara]
- twelfth – япшӀыкӀутӀунэрэ [jaːpʃʼəkʷʼətʷʼənara]
- twentieth – ятӀокӀынэрэ [jaːtʷʼat͡ʃənara]
- hundredth – яшъэнэрэ [jaːʂanara]

Usage examples:

- Япэрэ мафэ [jaːpara maːfa] – "First day"
- ЯтӀонэрэ мафэ [jaːtʷʼənara maːfa] – "second day"
- ЯтӀонэрэ цуакъо [jaːtʷʼənara t͡sʷaːqʷa]– "second shoe"
- Яхэнэрэ классым щегъэжьагъэу тутын сешъо – "I have been smoking since the sixth class."

=== Discrete numbers ===
Discrete numbers are formed by changing the last vowel ~ы (~ə) of number to ~эрэ (~ara):

- о плӀэрэ къыосӀогъах – "I have told you four times already."

Number can also define measure of a share: Numbers "one" and "two" are formed by words псау [psaw] ("whole, whole"), ренэ [rena] ("whole, whole" – about length of time), ныкъо [nəqʷa] ("the half").

=== Fractional numbers ===
Fractional numerals are formed from cardinal numerals with the help of the -(а)нэ /aːna/ morpheme:

- щы /ɕə/ ("three") – щанэ /ɕaːna/ ("third")
- плӀы /pɬʼə/ ("four") – плӀанэ /pɬʼaːna/ ("fourth")
- хы ("six") – ханэ /xaːna/ ("sixth")
- ...

Usage in a sentence:

- ЧӀыгоу къытатыгъэм изыщанэ картоф хэдгъэтӀысхьа́гъ – "On one third of the allocated land we have planted potatoes."
- Хатэм изыщанэ помидор хэдгъэтӀысхагъ – "Third part of vegetable garden we used for the tomatoes."
- Ахъщэ къыратыгъэм ыпӀланэ чыфэ ритыгъ – "The quarter of the money he received, he lent."

half (1÷2) – ныкъо [nəqʷa]
one third (1÷3) – щанэ [ɕaːna]
two thirds (2÷3) – щанитӀу [ɕaːnitʷʼ] (1÷3 × 2)
one fourth (1÷4) – плӀанэ [pɬʼaːna]
two fourths (2÷4) – плӀанитӀу [pɬʼaːnitʷʼ] (1÷4 × 2)
three fourths (3÷4) – плӀанищ [pɬʼaːniɕ] (1÷4 × 3)
one fifth (1÷5) – тфанэ [tfaːna]
one sixth (1÷6) – ханэ [xaːna]
one seventh (1÷7) – бланэ [blaːna]
one eighth (1÷8) – янэ [jaːna]
one ninth (1÷9) – бгъуанэ [bʁʷaːna]
one tenth (1÷10) – пшӀанэ [pʃʼaːna]
one eleventh (1÷11) – пшӀыкӀузанэ [pʃʼəkʷʼəzaːna]
one twelfth (1÷12) – пшӀыкӀутӀуанэ [pʃʼəkʷʼətʷʼaːna]
one twentieth (1÷20) – тӀокӀанэ [tʷʼat͡ʃaːna]
one hundredth (1÷100) – шъанэ [ʂaːna]

=== Separative numbers ===
Separative numerals are formed by repetition of the appropriate cardinal numeral with the help of the morpheme -ры /-rə/:

- зырыз /zərəz/ – "by one"
- тӀурытӀу /tʷʼərətʷʼ/ – "by twos"
- щырыщ /ɕərəɕ/ – "by threes"
- плӀырыплӀ /pɬʼərəplʼ/ – "by fours"
- тфырытф /tfərətf/ – "by fives"
- ...

In a sentence:

- ЕджакӀохэр экзаменым тӀурытӀоу чӀахьэщтыгъэх – "Pupils entered the examination room by twos."

=== Approximate numbers ===
Approximate numerals are formed as a combination of three cardinal numerals where the main constructive numeral is, usually, the numeral зы ("one"). For example:

- зыхыбл /zəxəbl/ зы-хы-бл – "about six or seven"
- зытӀущ /zətʷʼəɕ/ зы-тӀу-щ – "about two or three"
- Непэ садэжь нэбгырэ зытӀущ къыӀухьагъ – "About two or three people have approached me today."
