= Adjectives in Circassian =

From a morphological perspective, adjectives in the Circassian languages (Adyghe and Kabardian) share many characteristics with nouns. A key feature of Circassian grammar is phrase-final affixation: when an adjective modifies a noun, the noun itself usually remains in its bare stem form. The grammatical markers for number (plurality) and case (role in the sentence) attach to the end of the entire noun phrase—which usually means they attach to the adjective.

Adjectives are categorized into two main types:

- Qualitative adjectives: Describe qualities (e.g., "good", "white", "tall"). These usually follow the noun.
- Relative (Material) adjectives: Describe material or relation (e.g., "wood", "iron"). These usually precede the noun and do not change form.

The two literary Circassian languages, Adyghe (West Circassian) and Kabardian (East Circassian), behave almost identically with respect to adjectives; the differences are mostly in the specific lexical and phonological shapes of the words and a handful of suffixes. Where the two languages share an example or explanation, they are presented side by side below.

== Phrase-Final Affixation ==
Unlike in languages like Spanish or Russian where both the noun and adjective agree (change form), in Circassian only the last word in the phrase takes the suffix.

Example 1: Qualitative Adjective (Follows Noun) Here, the noun is "girl" (пшъэшъэ in Adyghe, пщащэ in Kabardian) and the adjective is дахэ (beautiful), which is shared by both languages.

Number	Language	Phrase	Breakdown	Gloss	Translation
Singular	Adyghe	Пшъэшъэ дахэр	пшъэшъэ дахэ-р	girl beautiful-ABS	"The beautiful girl"
Singular	Kabardian	Пщащэ дахэр	пщащэ дахэ-р	girl beautiful-ABS	"The beautiful girl"
Plural	Adyghe	Пшъэшъэ дахэхэр	пшъэшъэ дахэ-хэ-р	girl beautiful-PL-ABS	"The beautiful girls"
Plural	Kabardian	Пщащэ дахэхэр	пщащэ дахэ-хэ-р	girl beautiful-PL-ABS	"The beautiful girls"

Example 2: Suffixal Adjective (Augmentative) Some adjectives function as suffixes themselves, like "large/big" (~шхо in Adyghe, ~шхуэ in Kabardian). The case and number markers still attach to the very end.

Number	Language	Phrase	Breakdown	Gloss	Translation
Singular	Adyghe	Унэшхо	унэ-шхо	house-large	"A large house"
Singular	Kabardian	Унэшхуэр	унэ-шхуэ-р	house-large-ABS	"The large house"
Plural	Adyghe	Унэшхохэр	унэ-шхо-хэ-р	house-large-PL-ABS	"The large houses"
Plural	Kabardian	Унэшхуэхэр	унэ-шхуэ-хэ-р	house-large-PL-ABS	"The large houses"

== Declension ==
When an adjective is used substantively (as a noun, e.g., "the white one"), it takes the standard noun case markers directly.

Example: "White" (Фыжьы in Adyghe, Хужьы in Kabardian)

Case	Adyghe		Kabardian	
Case	Singular	Plural	Singular	Plural
Absolutive	фыжьыр	фыжьыхэр	хужьыр	хужьыхэр
Oblique / Ergative	фыжьым	фыжьыхэм	хужьым	хужьыхэм
Instrumental	фыжьы(м)кӀэ	фыжьыхэ(м)кӀэ	хужьы(м)кӀэ	хужьыхэ(м)кӀэ
Adverbial	фыжьэу	фыжьыхэу	хужьу	хужьыху

== Adjective Position Examples ==
Type	Language	Phrase	Breakdown	Gloss	Translation
Qualitative (Follows Noun)	Adyghe	КӀэлэ дэгъур	кӀэлэ дэгъу-р	boy good-ABS	"The good boy"
Qualitative (Follows Noun)	Kabardian	ЩӀалэ дэгъур	щӀалэ дэгъу-р	boy good-ABS	"The good boy"
Qualitative (Follows Noun)	Adyghe	Унэ лъагэм	унэ лъагэ-м	house high-ERG	"The high house (Erg/Obl)"
Qualitative (Follows Noun)	Kabardian	Унэ лъагэм	унэ лъагэ-м	house high-ERG	"The high house (Erg/Obl)"
Relative (Precedes Noun)	Adyghe	ГъучӀ пӀэкӀорыр	гъучӀ пӀэкӀор-ыр	iron bed-ABS	"The iron bed"
Relative (Precedes Noun)	Kabardian	ГъущӀ пӀэкӀорыр	гъущӀ пӀэкӀор-ыр	iron bed-ABS	"The iron bed"
Relative (Precedes Noun)	Adyghe	Пхъэ уатэмкӀэ	пхъэ уатэ-мкӀэ	wood hammer-INS	"Using the wooden hammer"
Relative (Precedes Noun)	Kabardian	Пхъэ уадэмкӀэ	пхъэ уадэ-мкӀэ	wood hammer-INS	"Using the wooden hammer"

Usage in Sentences

Language	Sentence	Gloss	Function	Translation
Adyghe	Сэ непэ пшъэшъэ дахэ слъэгъугъэ.	I today girl beautiful saw	A O VERB	"I saw a beautiful girl today."
Kabardian	Сэ нобэ пщащэ дахэ слъэгъуащ.	I today girl beautiful saw	A O VERB	"I saw a beautiful girl today."
Adyghe	Тэ гъогу занкӀэм тырыкӀуагъ.	We road straight-OBL walked-on	S IO VERB	"We were walking on the straight road."
Kabardian	Дэ гъуэгу занщӀэм дырыкӀуащ.	We road straight-OBL walked-on	S IO VERB	"We were walking on the straight road."
Adyghe	КӀэлэ кӀуачӀэр макӀо.	Boy strong-ABS goes	S VERB	"The strong boy is going."
Kabardian	ЩӀалэ лъэщыр макӀуэ.	Boy strong-ABS goes	S VERB	"The strong boy is going."

== Comparison ==
Adjectives have comparative and superlative forms used to express degrees of quality.

Comparative Degree Formed using the auxiliary word "more" (нахь in Adyghe, нэхъ in Kabardian).

Language	Sentence	Gloss	Translation
Adyghe	Ар ощ нахь лъагэ.	He you-than more high	"He is higher than you."
Kabardian	Ар абы нэхъ лъагэщ.	He that-one-than more high	"He is higher than that one."
Adyghe	Нахь ины хъугъэ.	More big became	"He became bigger."
Kabardian	Нэхъ ины хъуащ.	More big became	"He became bigger."
Adyghe	Нахь лӀэблан охъун фай.	More brave become must	"You must be braver."
Kabardian	Нэхъ лӀыгъэ къызхэбгъэлъын хуейщ.	More bravery show must	"You must be braver."

Superlative Degree Formed using the auxiliary word "most/more than all" (анахь in Adyghe; анахь or янэхъ in Kabardian).

Language	Sentence	Gloss	Translation
Adyghe	Ар пшъашъэмэ анахь дахэ.	She girls-among most beautiful	"She is the most beautiful among the girls."
Kabardian	Ар пщащэмэ янэхъ дахэщ.	She girls-among most beautiful	"She is the most beautiful among the girls."
Adyghe	Ар зэкӀэмэ анахь лъагэ.	It all-among most high	"It is the highest."
Kabardian	Ар псоми янэхъ лъагэщ.	It all-among most high	"It is the highest."
Adyghe	Ар заужмэ анахь лъэшы.	He everyone-among most strong	"He is the strongest."
Kabardian	Ар псоми янэхъ лъэщщ.	He everyone-among most strong	"He is the strongest."

== Affixes ==
Various suffixes can be added to nouns and adjectives to modify their meaning (diminutives, augmentatives, intensifiers).

Suffixes for Nouns

Meaning	Adyghe suffix	Adyghe example	Kabardian suffix	Kabardian example
new	~кӀэ (~t͡ʃʼa)	унакӀэ (new house)	~щӀэ (~ɕʼa)	унащӀэ (new house)
old	~жъы (~ʐə)	унэжъы (old house)	~жьы (~ʑə)	унэжьы (old house)
large/big	~шхо (~ʃxʷa)	унэшхо (large house)	~шхуэ (~ʃxʷa)	унэшхуэ (large house)
small	~цӀыкӀу (~t͡sʼəkʷʼ)	унэцӀыкӀу (small house)	~цӀыкӀу (~t͡sʼəkʷʼ)	унэцӀыкӀу (small house)
small/tiny	~жъый (~ʐəj)	унэжъый (tiny house)	(no distinct Kabardian suffix; cf. ~цӀыкӀу "small")	

Suffixes for Adjectives

Meaning	Adyghe suffix	Adyghe example	Kabardian suffix	Kabardian example
slightly	~Ӏо (~ʔʷa)	дыджыӀо (slightly bitter)	~Ӏуэ (~ʔʷa)	стырыӀуэ (slightly spicy)
too much/excessively	~щэ (~ɕa)	дыджыщэ (too bitter)	~щэ (~ɕa)	дыджыщэ (too bitter)
very	~дэд (~dad)	дэгъудэд (very good)	~дэд (~dad)	дэгъудэд (very good)
absolutely/completely	~бз (~bz)	дэгъуабз (absolutely good)	(no standard Kabardian equivalent)	
truly/really	~шъыпкъ (~ʂəpq)	дэгъушъыпкъ (really good)	(no standard Kabardian equivalent)	
kind of/ish	~ашъу (~aːʃʷ)	дэгъуашъу (kind of good/good-ish)	(no standard Kabardian equivalent)	
quite/pretty	~кӀай (~t͡ʃʼaːj)	дэгъукӀай (quite good)	~кӀей (~t͡ʃʼej)	дэгъукӀей (pretty good)
lacking/less	~нчъэ (~nt͡ʂa)	акъылынчъэ (mindless)	~ншэ (~nʃa)	акъылыншэ (mindless)

Examples

Language	Sentence	Breakdown	Translation
Adyghe	Мы джанэр оркӀэ иныӀо.	big-slightly	"This shirt is slightly big for you."
Kabardian	Мы джанэр уэркӀэ иныӀуэ.	big-slightly	"This shirt is slightly big for you."
Adyghe	Мы джанэр иныщэ.	big-too.much	"This shirt is too large."
Kabardian	Мы джанэр иныщэ.	big-too.much	"This shirt is too large."
Adyghe	Мы сурэтыр дэхэдэд.	beautiful-very	"This painting is very beautiful."
Kabardian	Мы сурэтыр дэхэдэд.	beautiful-very	"This painting is very beautiful."

=== Opinion (Psychological Predicates) ===
To indicate that a quality is perceived by someone (an opinion or feeling), a prefix is added to the adjective (шӀо~ (ʃʷʼa~) in Adyghe, фӀэ~ (fʼa~) in Kabardian). This transforms the adjective into a verbal construction meaning "X is [ADJ] to Y".

Meaning	Adyghe (шӀо~)		Kabardian (фӀэ~)	
Base adjective	Derived form	Base adjective	Derived form	
pretty → "it is pretty to him/her"	дахэ	шӀодах	дахэ	фӀэдах
tasty → "it is tasty to him/her"	ӀэшӀу	шӀоӀэшӀу	ӀэфӀ	фӀэӀэфӀ
red → "it looks red to him/her"	плъыжьы	шӀоплъыжь	плъыжь	фӀэплъыжь

Language	Sentence	Gloss	Translation
Adyghe	КӀалэхэмэ ашӀодахэп сиджанэ.	Boys.ERG 3PL-OPINION-pretty-NEG my-shirt	"My shirt was not beautiful to the boys."
Kabardian	ЩӀалэхэмэ яфӀэдахэкъым си джанэ.	Boys.ERG 3PL-OPINION-pretty-NEG my-shirt	"My shirt was not beautiful to the boys."
Adyghe	Мы мыӀэрысэм иуасэ пшӀолъапӀа?	... its-cost 2SG-OPINION-expensive-Q	"Is this apple expensive to you?"
Kabardian	Мы мыӀэрысэм и уасэ пфӀэлъапӀэ?	... its-cost 2SG-OPINION-expensive-Q	"Is this apple expensive to you?"

=== Scaliness (Abstract Nouns) ===
The suffix ~гъэ (~ʁa) is appended to adjectives to turn them into abstract nouns representing the measure or quality itself (e.g., "length" from "long").

Meaning (adjective → abstract noun)	Adyghe		Kabardian	
Base adjective	Derived noun	Base adjective	Derived noun	
long → length	кӀыхьэ	кӀыхьагъэ	кӀыхь	кӀыхьагъэ
fast → speed	псынкӀэ	псынкӀагъэ	псынщӀэ	псынщӀагъэ
hot → heat	фабэ	фэбагъэ	хуабэ	хуабагъэ
strong → strength	кӀуачӀэ	кӀочӀагъэ	лъэщ	лъэщыгъэ
wide/thick → width/thickness	Ӏужъу	Ӏужъугъэ	Ӏув	Ӏувыгъэ
beautiful → beauty	дахэ	дэхагъэ	дахэ	дэхагъэ
tasty → tastiness	ӀэшӀу	ӀэшӀугъэ	ӀэфӀ	ӀэфӀыгъэ

Language	Sentence	Gloss	Translation
Adyghe	Пхъэм иӀужъугъэ 65 сантиметр.	Wood-OBL its-width 65 cm	"The wood's width is 65 centimeters."
Kabardian	Пхъэм и Ӏувыгъэр 65 сантиметр.	Wood-OBL its-width 65 cm	"The wood's width is 65 centimeters."
Adyghe	КӀалэм кӀочӀагъэ хэлъ.	Boy-OBL strength lies-in	"The boy has strength in him."
Kabardian	ЩӀалэм лъэщыгъэ хэлъ.	Boy-OBL strength lies-in	"The boy has strength in him."

=== State of the Adjective ===
The suffix ~гъакӀэ (~ʁaːt͡ʃʼa) forms nouns meaning "the state/essence of being X", which is distinct from the measurable scale marked by ~гъэ.

Meaning (adjective → state noun)	Adyghe		Kabardian	
Base adjective	Derived noun	Base adjective	Derived noun	
long → lengthiness	кӀыхьэ	кӀыхьэгъакӀэ	кӀыхь	кӀыхьэгъакӀэ
pretty → prettiness	дахэ	дэхэгъакӀэ	дахэ	дэхэгъакӀэ
strong → strongness	кӀуачӀэ	кӀочӀэгъакӀэ	лъэщ	лъэщыгъакӀэ
good → goodness	дэгъу	шӀугъакӀэ	фӀы	фӀагъакӀэ
tasty → tastiness	ӀэшӀу	ӀэшӀугъакӀэ	ӀэфӀ	ӀэфӀыгъакӀэ

Language	Sentence	Gloss	Translation
Adyghe	ЛӀыжъым ишӀугъакӀэ пае...	Old-man-OBL his-goodness-state due-to...	"Due to the old man's (inherent) goodness..."
Kabardian	ЛӀыжьым и фӀагъакӀэ папщӀэ...	Old-man-OBL his-goodness-state due-to...	"Due to the old man's (inherent) goodness..."

=== Bibliography ===
- Аркадьев, П. М.; Ландер, Ю. А.; Летучий, А. Б.; Сумбатова, Н. Р.; Тестелец, Я. Г. Введение. Основные сведения об адыгейском языке в кн.: "Аспекты полисинтетизма: очерки по грамматике адыгейского языка" под ред.: П. М. Аркадьев, А. Б. Летучий, Н. Р. Сумбатова, Я. Г. Тестелец. Москва: РГГУ, 2009 (Arkadiev, P. M.; Lander, Yu. A.; Letuchiy, A. B.; Sumbatova, N. R.; Testelets, Ya. G.
- Introduction. Basic information about Adyghe language in "Aspects of polysyntheticity: studies on Adyghe grammar" edited by: P. M. Arkadiev, A. B. Letuchiy, N. R. Sumbatova, Ya. G. Testelets. Moscow, RGGU, 2009) (in Russian) ISBN 978-5-7281-1075-0
- Ranko Matasović, A Short Grammar of East Circassian (Kabardian): .
- Caucasus Studies 1 CIRCASSIAN Clause Structure Mukhadin Kumakhov & Karina Vamling
- Кумахов, М. А. Морфология адыгских языков. Синхронно-диахронная характеристика. I. Введение, структура слова, словообразование частей речи. Нальчик: Кабардино-Балкарское книжное издательство, 1964.
- Аркадьев, П. М.; Летучий, А. Б.; Сумбатова, Н. Р.; Тестелец, Я. Г. (ред.). Аспекты полисинтетизма: очерки по грамматике адыгейского языка. Москва: Российский государственный гуманитарный университет, 2009. ISBN 978-5-7281-1075-0
- Яковлев, Н. Ф. Краткая грамматика кабардино-черкесского языка. Выпуск I. Синтаксис и морфология. Ворошиловск: Орджоникидзевское краевое издательство, 1938.
- Яковлев, Н. Ф. Грамматика литературного кабардино-черкесского языка. Москва - Ленинград: Издательство Академии наук СССР, 1948.
- Абдоков, А. И. Фонетические и лексические параллели абхазско-адыгских языков. Нальчик, 1973.
- Шагиров, А. К. Этимологический словарь адыгских (черкесских) языков. А-Н. Москва: Издательство «Наука», 1977.
- Урыс, Хь. Щ. Адыгэ грамматикэ. Фонетикэ, морфонемикэ, морфологие. Налшык: «Эльбрус», 2001.
- Апажев, М. Л. Современный кабардино-черкесский язык. Лексикология, лексикография. Нальчик: «Эльбрус», 2000.
- Яковлев, Н.; Ашхамаф, Д. Грамматика адыгейского литературного языка. Москва - Ленинград: Издательство Академии наук СССР, 1941.
- Рогава, Г. В.; Керашева, З. И. Грамматика адыгейского языка. Краснодар - Майкоп: Краснодарское книжное издательство, 1966.
- Kumakhov, Mukhadin & Vamling, Karina. Circassian Clause Structure (Caucasus Studies 1). Malmö: Malmö University, 2009. ISBN 978-91-7104-083-1
- Кумахов, Мухадин; Вамлинг, Карина. Дополнительные конструкции в кабардинском языке. Lund: Department of Linguistics, Lund University, 1998.
- Кумахов, Мухадин; Вамлинг, Карина. Эргативность в черкесских языках / Circassian Clause Structure. Malmö: Malmö University, 2006. ISBN 91-631-9191-1

| Adyghe | Сэ мыӀэрысэм иӀэшӀугъакӀэ сыкъегъатхъэ. | ... apple-OBL its-tastiness-state ... | "I enjoy the apple's tastiness." |- | Kabardian | Сэ мыӀэрысэм и ӀэфӀыгъакӀэм сыкъегъатхъэ. | ... apple-OBL its-tastiness-state ... | "I enjoy the apple's tastiness." |}
