= Mingrelian grammar =

Grammar of the Mingrelian language

Mingrelian is a Kartvelian language from the Caucasus. Like other languages in the area, it contains a large number of grammatical cases and shows ergative alignment. Mingrelian is mostly agglutinative in terms of morphological inflection, although it has no grammatical gender or noun classes, unlike neighbouring Caucasian languages from the Nakh-Dagestanian family. Mingrelian verbs index numerous tense-aspect-moods, with traces of evidentiality indexation.

Mingrelian has two dialects: Zugdidi-Samurzakano (northwestern) and Senaki-Martvili (southeastern).

== Grammatical cases ==
Mingrelian has nine grammatical cases, which are indexed in all nominals. Unlike neighboring Nakh-Dagestanian languages, Mingrelian verbs show no case markings. Grammatical case endings are the same for nouns and adjectives, both in the singular and the plural, unlike many Indo-European languages such as Latin or Polish. Mingrelian case morphemes are shown below.

Case	Mingrelian	
nominative	-ი	-i
ergative	-ქ	-k
dative	-ს	-s
locative	-ს	-s
genitive	-იშ	-iş /iʃ/
lative	-იშა	-işa /iʃa/
ablative	-იშე	-işe /iʃe/
instrumental	-ით	-it
adverbial	-ო(თ)	-o(t)
benefactive	-იშო(თ)	-işo(t) /iʃot/

=== Nominals ===
Mingrelian nouns and adjectives occur in singular and plural forms.

==== Example of noun declension ====
Example of the declension of noun stem კოჩ- (ǩoç- “man”) in singular and plural forms.

Case/Number	Singular			Plural		
Case/Number	Mkhedruli	Romanized	IPA	Mkhedruli	Romanized	IPA
Nominative	კოჩი	ǩoç-i	/ kʼɔtʃʰi /	კოჩეფი	ǩoç-ep-i	/ kʼɔtʃʰɛpʰi /
Ergative	კოჩქ	ǩoç-k	/ kʼɔtʃʰkʰ /	კოჩეფქ	ǩoç-ep-k	/ kʼɔtʃʰɛpʰkʰ /
Dative	კოჩს	ǩoç-s	/ kʼɔtʃʰs /	კოჩეფს	ǩoç-ep-s	/ kʼɔtʃʰɛpʰs /
Genitive	კოჩიშ	ǩoç-iş	/ kʼɔtʃʰiʃ /	კოჩეფიშ	ǩoç-ep-iş	/ kʼɔtʃʰɛpʰiʃ /
Lative	კოჩიშა	ǩoş-işa	/ kʼɔtʃʰiʃa /	კოჩეფიშა	ǩoç-ep-işa	/ kʼɔtʃʰɛpʰiʃa /
Ablative	კოჩიშე	ǩoç-işe	/ kʼɔtʃʰiʃɛ /	კოჩეფიშე	ǩoç-ep-işe	/ kʼɔtʃʰɛpʰiʃɛ /
Instrumental	კოჩით	ǩoç-it	/ kʼɔtʃʰit /	კოჩეფით	ǩoç-ep-it	/ kʼɔtʃʰɛpʰit /
Adverbial	კოჩო	ǩoç-o	/ kʼɔtʃʰɔ /	კოჩეფო	ǩoç-ep-o	/ kʼɔtʃʰɛpʰɔ /
Benefactive	კოჩიშო	ǩoç-išo	/ kʼɔtʃʰiʃɔ /	კოჩეფიშო	ǩoç-ep-işo	/ kʼɔtʃʰɛpʰiʃɔ /

==== Example of adjective declension ====
Declension of stem ჯვეშ- (ǯveş- “old”) in singular and plural forms.

Case	Singular			Plural	
	Mkhedruli	Romanization	IPA	Mkhedruli	Romanization
Nominative	ჯვეში	ǯveş-i	/ dʒveʃi /	ჯვეშეფი	ǯveş-ep-i
Ergative	ჯვეშქ	ǯveş-k	/ dʒveʃk /	ჯვეშეფქ	ǯveş-ep-k
Dative	ჯვეშს	ǯveş-s	/ dʒveʃs /	ჯვეშეფს	ǯveş-ep-s
Genitive	ჯვეშიშ	ǯveş-iş	/ dʒveʃiʃ /	ჯვეშეფიშ	ǯveş-ep-iş
Lative	ჯვეშიშა	ǯveş-işa	/ dʒveʃiʃa /	ჯვეშეფიშა	ǯveş-ep-işa
Ablative	ჯვეშიშე	ǯveş-işe	/ dʒveʃiʃe /	ჯვეშეფიშე	ǯveş-ep-işe
Instrumental	ჯვეშით	ǯveş-it	/ dʒveʃit /	ჯვეშეფით	ǯveş-ep-it
Adverbial	ჯვეშო	ǯveş-o	/ dʒveʃo /	ჯვეშეფო	ǯveş-ep-o
Benefactive	ჯვეშიშო	ǯveş-işo	/ dʒveʃiʃo /	ჯვეშეფიშო	ǯveş-ep-işo

==== Comparison with other Kartvelian languages ====
Example of the declension of noun stem კოჩ- (ǩoç- “man”) in comparison to corresponding Laz კოჩ- (ǩoç-), Georgian კაც- (kʼats-) and Svan č'äš (“husband”) forms. Note that Laz does not index adverbial and benefactive cases through suffixes, neither do Georgian nor Svan index the lative or ablative.

Case	Singular					Plural				
Case	Mingrelian		Laz	Georgian	Svan	Mingrelian		Laz	Georgian	Svan
Nominative	კოჩი	ǩoçi	ǩoçi	kʼatsi	č'äš	კოჩეფი	ǩoçepi	ǩoçepe	kʼatsebi	č'äšär
Ergative	კოჩქ	ǩoçk	ǩoçik	kʼatsma	č'äšd	კოჩეფქ	ǩoçepk	ǩoçepek	kʼatsebma	č'äšärd
Dative	კოჩს	ǩoçs	ǩoçis	kʼatss	č'äšs	კოჩეფს	ǩoçeps	ǩoçepes	kʼatsebs	č'äšärs
Genitive	კოჩიშ	ǩoçiş	ǩoçiş	kʼatsis	č'äšiš	კოჩეფიშ	ǩoçepiş	ǩoçepeş	kʼatsebis	č'äšäriš
Lative	კოჩიშა	ǩoşişa	ǩoçişa	-	-	კოჩეფიშა	ǩoçepişa	ǩoçepeşa		
Ablative	კოჩიშე	ǩoçişe	ǩoçişe	-	-	კოჩეფიშე	ǩoçepişe	ǩoçepeşe		
Instrumental	კოჩით	ǩoçit	ǩoçite	kʼatsit	č'äššw	კოჩეფით	ǩoçepit	ǩoçepete	kʼatsebit	č'äšäršw
Adverbial	კოჩო	ǩoço		kʼatsad	č'äšd	კოჩეფო	ǩoçepo		kʼatsebad	č'äšärd
Benefactive	კოჩიშო	ǩoçišo		kʼatsistvis	č'äšišd	კოჩეფიშო	ǩoçepişo		kʼatsebistvis	č'äšärišd

=== Traces of noun classification ===
Mingrelian has traces of a noun classification system that distinguishes animacy semantically along the lines of human-like or un-human-like.

Concrete			Abstract
Animate		Inanimate	
Human and "human-like" beings (e.g. God, deities, angels)	Animals	Inanimate physical entities	Abstract objects
Human-like	Un-human-like		
mi? ("who?")	mu? ("what?")		

=== Pronouns ===
==== Personal pronouns (nominative) ====
I	მა	ma
You (sing.)	სი	si
We	ჩქი/ჩქჷ	çki/çkə
You (pl.)	თქვა	tkva

==== Demonstrative pronouns (nominative) ====
Singular		Plural	
This	ina	These	(t)enepi
That	ena	Those	(t)inepi

==== Possessive pronouns ====
1st person	singular	ჩქიმი/ჩქჷმი	çkimi/çkəmi
1st person	plural	ჩქინი/ჩქჷნი	çkini/çkəni
2nd person	singular	სქანი	skani
2nd person	plural	თქვანი	tkvani
3rd person	singular	მუში	muşi
3rd person	plural	ინეფიშ	inepiş

== Verbs ==
The Mingrelian verb has the categories of person, number, version, tense, mood, aspect, voice, and verbal focus.

=== Personality and number ===
In Mingrelian the verbs can be monovalent, bivalent or trivalent. This feature is also shared with other Kartvelian languages.

- Monovalent verbs are represented only by subjective person and are always intransitive.
- Bivalent verbs together with subject have also one object (direct or indirect). They are:
  - transitive in the case of direct object
  - intransitive if the object is indirect
- Trivalent verbs have one subject and always both, direct and indirect objects and are ditransitive.

==== Table of verb personality ====
	Unipersonal	Bipersonal		Tripersonal
	intransitive	transitive	intransitive	ditransitive
Subject	+	+	+	+
Direct Object		+		+
Indirect Object			+	+

The person may be singular or plural.

Subject and object markers in Mingrelian are roughly the same as in Laz.

==== Subject markers ====
	Singular	Plural
S1	v-	v-...-t
S2	∅-	∅-...-t
S3	∅-...-∅/-s/-u	∅-...-na/-es

==== Object markers ====
	Singular	Plural
O1	m-	m-...-na/-es/-t
O2	g-	g-...-na/-es/-t
O3	∅-	∅-...-na/-es

In pre-consonant position the markers v- and g- may change phonetically:

- v- → b- (in Zugdidi-Samurzakano dialect)
- g- → r- (in both dialects)

=== Version ===
In Mingrelian there are four types of version marking:

- subjective – shows that the action is intended for oneself,
- objective – action is intended for another person,
- objective-passive – the action is intended for another person and at the same time indicating the passiveness of subject,
- neutral – neutral with respect to intention.

Version markers
Version	Mingrelian	Laz	Georgian	Svan
Subjective	-i-	-i-	-i-	-i-
Objective	-u-	-u-	-u-	-o-
Objective-passive	-a-	-a-	-e-	-e-
Neutral	-o-/-a	-o-	-a-	-a-

=== Tenses ===
In total there are 20 screeves in Mingrelian. They are grouped in four series.

Verb screeves (sample conjugation)
I series
Screeve	Stem: ç̌ar- "to write"	Translation
present	ç̌aruns	s/he writes
imperfect	ç̌arundu	s/he was writing
imperfective optative	ç̌arundas	s/he were writing
imperfective conditional	ç̌arundu-ǩon	if s/he were writing
future imperfect	ç̌arundas iʔuapu(n)/iʔii(n)	s/he will be writing
conditional of future imperfect in the past	ç̌arundu-ǩon iɣuapudu/iɣiidu	if s/he were writing
future	doç̌aruns	s/he will write
future in the past	doç̌arundu	s/he would write
future optative	doç̌arundas	
II series
aorist	ç̌aru	s/he wrote
aorist optative	ç̌aras	should s/he write
aorist conditional	ç̌aru-ǩon	if s/he wrote
III series
inferential I	uç̌aru(n)	(it seems) s/he has written
inferential II	uç̌arudu	(it seems) s/he had written
inferential optative I	uç̌arudas	may s/he have written
inferential conditional II	uç̌arudu-ǩon	if s/he have written
IV series
inferential III	noç̌arue(n)	(it seems) s/he has written
inferential IV	noç̌aruedu	(it seems) s/he had written
inferential optative III	noç̌aruedas	may s/he have written
Inferential conditional IV	noç̌aruedu-ǩon	if s/he have written

=== Moods ===
Indicative

Indicative statement claims that the proposition should be taken as an apparent fact.

Interrogative

There are two ways to express interrogative mood:

- with interrogative words, e.g. mi? (who?), mu? (what?), so? (where?), muzhams? (when?), muç̌o? (how?) etc.
- by attaching an interrogative particle -o to the end of a verb.

Imperative

Indicates a command or request. The aorist form is used when addressing 2nd person (singular/plural) and aorist optative in all other cases.

Subjunctive

Expresses possibility, wish, desire. The subjunctive mood in Mingrelian is provided by optative screeves.

Conditional

Indicates condition in contrary to a fact. It is produced by adding a verbal suffix -ǩo(ni) to the end of a verb.

=== Aspect ===
In Mingrelian the verbs may have two aspects depending on the completeness of action (perfective aspect) or the lack of it (imperfective aspect). The perfective aspect is derived by adding a preverb to the verb.

In 2nd, 3rd, 4th series the verbs equally have both aspect forms, while in the 1st series the screeves are distributed between two aspects.

Aspect distribution in the 1st series
Imperfective Aspect
Screeve	Stem: ჭარ- ç̌ar- "to write"		Translation
present	ჭარუნს	ç̌aruns	s/he writes
imperfect	ჭარუნდუ	ç̌arundu	s/he was writing
imperfective optative	ჭარუნდას	ç̌arundas	s/he were writing
imperfective conditional	ჭარუნდუ კონ	ç̌arundu ǩon	if s/he were writing
future imperfect	ჭარუნდას იჸუაფუნ/იჸიიდუ	ç̌arundas iʔuapu(n)/iʔii(n)	s/he will be writing
conditional of future imperfect in the past		ç̌arundu ǩon iʔuapudu/iʔiidu	if s/he were writing
Perfective Aspect
future	დოჭარუნს	do-ç̌ar-uns	s/he will write
future in the past	დოჭარუნდუ	do-ç̌arundu	s/he would write
future optative	დოჭარუნდას	doç̌arundas	

== Lexicon ==
=== Kinship terms ===
Mingrelian words for kinship reflect both generation and gender, although many words are derived. It has a mixed system of classificatory and descriptive system. Mingrelian kinship terms denote a large number of members of one's extended family as well as in-laws.

==== Nuclear family ====
Nuclear family
Mother	დიდა	dida
Father	მუმა	muma
Sister	და	da
Brother	ჯიმა	djima
Daughter	ოსორისქუა	osoriskua
Son	ბოში	boşi
Wife	ოსური	osuri
Husband	ქომონჯი	komondji

==== Extended family ====
Extended family
Grandmother		ბები	bebi
Grandfather		ბაბუ	babu
Aunt	maternal	დეიდა	deida
Aunt	paternal	მამიდა	mamida
Uncle	maternal	ბიძია	bižia
Uncle	paternal	ბიძია	bižia
Niece or Nephew	brother's child	ჯიმასქუა	djimaskua
Niece or Nephew	sister's child	დასქუა	daskua
Cousin	aunt's child	მამიდასქუა	mamidaskua
Cousin	uncle's child	ბიძასქუა	bižaskua

==== In-laws and step-family ====
In-laws and Step family
Mother-in-law	დიანთილი	diantili
Father-in-law	მუანთილი	muantili
Son-in-law	გესინჯებული	gesindjebuli
Parents of your child's spouse	ზახალეფი	zaxalefi
Sister-in-law	ოხოლასქილი	oxolaskili
Brother-in-law	სინჯა	sindja
Stepmother	დიდაჸონირი	didaɔoneri
Stepfather	მუმაჸონირი	mumaɔoneri
Stepchild	სქუაჸონირი	skuaɔoniri

=== Numerals ===
Mingrelian numerals follow a vigesimal system (i.e. base 20), like in Georgian.

==== Cardinal numbers ====
Most of the Mingrelian cardinal numbers are inherited from Proto-Kartvelian language, except arti (one) and eçi (twenty), which are considered as a Karto-Zan heritage, since there are no regular equivalents in Svan.

Cardinal numbers' table
	Mingrelian	
1	ართი	arti
2	ჟირი/ჟჷრი	zhiri/zhəri
3	სუმი	sumi
4	ოთხი	otxi
5	ხუთი	xuti
6	ამშვი	amşvi
7	შქვითი	şkviti
8	(ბ)რუო	(b)ruo
9	ჩხორო	çxoro
10	ვითი	viti
11	ვითაართი	vitaarti
12	ვითოჟირი	vitozhiri
13	ვითოსუმი	vitosumi
14	ვითაანთხი	vitaantxi
15	ვითოხუთი	vitoxuti
20	ეჩი	eçi
21	ეჩდოართი	eçdoarti
30	ეჩდოვითი	eçdoviti
40	ჟაარნეჩი	zhaarneçi
50	ჟაარნეჩიდოვიჩი	zhaarneçidoviti
60	სუმონეჩი	sumoneçi
70	სუმონეჩდოვითი	sumoneçdoviti
80	ოთხონეჩი	otxoneçi
90	ოთხონეჩდოვითი	otxoneçdoviti
100	ოში	oşi
101	ოშართი	oşarti
102	ოშჟირი	oşzhiri
110	ოშვითი	oşviti
200	ჟიროში	zhiroşi
500	ხუთოში	xutoşi
1000	ანთასი	antasi
1999	ანთას ჩხოროშ ოთხონეჩდოვითოჩხორო	antas çxoroş otxoneçdovitoçxoro
2000	ჟირი ანთასი	zhiri antasi
10000	ვითი ანთასი	viti antasi

==== Ordinal numbers ====
In Mingrelian, ordinal numbers are derived by the circumfix ma- -a, with the exception of the word for “first”, პირველი (p̌irveli), which is not derived from the word for “one” ართი arti.

Ordinal
ma-NUMBER-a

Ordinal numbers
	Mingrelian
1st	p̌irveli
2nd	mazhira
3rd	masuma
4th	maotxa/mantxa
5th	maxuta
6th	maamşva
7th	maşkvita
8th	maruo
9th	maçxora
10th	mavita
11th	mavitaarta
12th	mavitozhira
20th	maeça
21st	eçdomaarta
30th	eçdomavita
100th	maoşa
101st	oşmaarta
102nd	oşmazhira
110th	oşmavita
200th	mazhiroşa
500th	maxutoşa
1000th	maantasa

==== Fractional numbers ====
The fractional numbers derivation rule in Mingrelian is akin to Old Georgian and Svan.

Fractional number derivation
Mingrelian/Laz	na-NUMBER-al/or

Fractional numbers' table
	Mingrelian
whole	teli
1/2	gverdi
1/3	nasumori
1/4	naotxali or naantxali
1/5	naxutali
1/6	naamşvali
1/7	naşkvitali
1/8	naruali
1/9	naçxorali
1/10	navitali
1/11	navitaartali
1/12	navitozhirali
1/20	naeçali
1/100	naoşali
1/1000	naantasali
