= Nouns in Circassian =

This article describes the properties of nouns in the Circassian languages, encompassing both the Adyghe language (West Circassian) and the Kabardian language (East Circassian).

== Singular and plural ==
A Circassian noun can be in one of two states: singular or plural.

Singular nouns carry a zero morpheme (no prefixes or suffixes), while plural nouns use the suffix -хэ (-xa), which is attached to the stem. In both dialects, a plural noun must typically be in its definite form, meaning it includes case markers such as -р or -м (with exemptions for names and vocative uses).

- Adyghe:
  - Singular: унэ ('house'); тхылъ ('book').
  - Plural: унэ-хэ-р ('houses'); тхылъ-хэ-р ('books').
- Kabardian:
  - Singular: унэ ('house'); тхылъ ('book').
  - Plural: унэ-хэ-р ('houses'); тхылъ-хэ-р ('books').

=== Collective Nouns ===
In Circassian, collective nouns such as жылэ (village), къуаджэ / къуажэ (village), хьэблэ (district), and унагъо / унагъуэ (family) are noteworthy. They can refer to the members of that group and act as a plurale tantum which cannot take the plural suffix itself, though it triggers plural agreement elsewhere in the sentence.

- жылэм яIэр яIэтмэ, сэри си Iэр сIэтынщ — 'if the villagers vote, I will also vote' (lit. 'if the villagers raise their hands, I will raise my hand too').

=== Plurality in Verbs ===
Circassian verbs also mark plurality. The plural marking on the noun is sometimes optional because it is frequently encoded in other parts of the sentence (like the verb or possessive marking). Verbs use two distinct types of plural markers based on syntactic role:

- Absolutive: Indicated by the suffix -х- (placed after the root).
  - Adyghe: макӀо ('he is going') vs. макӀох ('they are going').
  - Kabardian: макӀуэ ('he is going') vs. макӀуэхэ ('they are going').
- Ergative-Oblique: Indicated by the prefix -а- or -я- (placed before the root).
  - Adyghe: ыӀуагъ ('he said') vs. а-Ӏуагъ ('they said').
  - Kabardian: жиIащ ('he said') vs. жаIащ ('they said').

== Definiteness ==
Circassian nouns differentiate between definite and indefinite forms, similar to the function of articles (the vs. a/an) in English.

- Indefinite: The noun usually has no case suffix (zero marking). Used for generalizations or when the object is unknown.
  - Adyghe: кӀалэ ('a boy'; undefined).
  - Kabardian: щӀалэ ('a boy'; undefined).
- Definite: The noun takes a specific case marker, usually -р (absolutive) or -м (ergative/oblique). Used when the referent is specific or known.
  - Adyghe: кӀалэр ('the boy').
  - Kabardian: щӀалэр ('the boy').

== Noun cases ==
Circassian declines nouns into four distinct cases. It is an ergative-absolutive language family, which fundamentally changes how subjects and objects are marked compared to nominative-accusative languages. The absolutive and ergative cases are considered primary, while instrumental and adverbial are periphery cases.

Circassian noun cases
Case	Suffix	IPA	Adyghe Example	Kabardian Example
Absolutive	р	/r/	кӀалэр ('the boy')	щӀалэр ('the boy')
Ergative-Oblique	м	/m/	кӀалэм ('the boy's' / 'to the boy')	щӀалэм ('the boy's' / 'to the boy')
Instrumental	(м)кӀэ	/(m)t͡ʃʼa/	кӀалэмкӀэ ('using the boy')	щӀалэмкӀэ ('using the boy')
Adverbial	эу / ыу / у(э)	/aw/, /əw/	кӀалэу ('as a boy')	щӀалу ('as a boy')

=== Third-person (Demonstrative) Pronouns ===
The 3rd person pronouns (which also serve as demonstrative pronouns) take different root forms for cases rather than standard noun suffixes:

- Absolutive: Ар (singular), Ахэр (plural).
- Ergative-Oblique: Ащ (singular), Ахэм (plural).
  - In some Adyghe dialects, Ай is used instead of Ащ.

=== Absolutive case (-р) ===
The default, unmarked state of a noun. In an ergative language, the absolutive case marks the core participant that is most directly affected by the verb (undergoing state change, motion, or creation). It marks the subject of an intransitive verb and the direct object of a transitive verb.

1. Marking the subject of monovalent intransitive verbs
	Adyghe			Kabardian		
Sentence:	КӀалэр еджапӀэм кӀуагъэ.			ЩӀалэр еджапӀэм кӀуащ.		
Word:	КӀалэ-р	еджапӀэ-м	кӀуагъэ	ЩӀалэ-р	еджапӀэ-м	кӀуащ
Gloss:	boy-ABS	school-OBL	went	boy-ABS	school-OBL	went
Function:	S	LOC	VERB_{intrans}	S	LOC	VERB_{intrans}
Translation:	"The boy went to the school."					

2. Marking the subject of bivalent intransitive verbs
	Adyghe			Kabardian		
Sentence:	КӀалэр тхылъым еджэ.			ЩӀалэр тхылъым йоджэ.		
Word:	КӀалэ-р	тхылъы-м	еджэ	ЩӀалэ-р	тхылъы-м	йоджэ
Gloss:	boy-ABS	book-OBL	reads	boy-ABS	book-OBL	reads
Function:	S	IO	VERB_{intrans}	S	IO	VERB_{intrans}
Translation:	"The boy is reading the book."					

3. Marking the direct object of transitive verbs
	Adyghe			Kabardian		
Sentence:	Бзылъфыгъэм джанэр егъэкъабзэ.			Бзылъхугъэм джанэр егыкӀы.		
Word:	Бзылъфыгъэ-м	джанэ-р	егъэкъабзэ	Бзылъхугъэ-м	джанэ-р	егыкӀы
Gloss:	woman-ERG	shirt-ABS	cleans	woman-ERG	shirt-ABS	laundries
Function:	A	O	VERB_{trans}	A	O	VERB_{trans}
Translation:	"The woman cleans/laundries the shirt."					

=== Ergative-Oblique case (-м) ===
This highly versatile case serves two distinct syntactic macro-roles: the Ergative role (the initiator of an action) and the Oblique role (the target, recipient, or location of an action).

==== Ergative role ====
Marks the active agent or possessor.

1. Marking the subject of transitive verbs: The agent deliberately causes the object to undergo a change.

	Adyghe			Kabardian		
Sentence:	ЛӀым Ӏанэр екъутэ.			ЛӀым мафӀэр егъэункIыфI.		
Word:	ЛӀы-м	Ӏанэ-р	екъутэ	ЛӀы-м	мафӀэ-р	егъэункIыфI
Gloss:	man-ERG	table-ABS	breaks	man-ERG	fire-ABS	extinguishes
Function:	A	O	VERB_{trans}	A	O	VERB_{trans}
Translation:	"The man breaks the table."			"The man extinguishes the fire."		

2. Marking Possession: Acts as the possessor in a genitive construction, pairing with a possessive prefix (like и-) on the possessed noun.

	Adyghe			Kabardian		
Sentence:	КӀалэм иунэ дахэ.			ЩӀалэм и унэ дахэщ.		
Word:	КӀалэ-м	и-унэ	дахэ	ЩӀалэ-м	и-унэ	дахэ(щ)
Gloss:	boy-ERG	his-house	beautiful	boy-ERG	his-house	beautiful
Function:	POSS	NOUN	ADJ	POSS	NOUN	ADJ
Translation:	"The boy's house is beautiful."					

==== Oblique role ====
Unlike the Absolutive case, Oblique nouns show no indication of a state change. They act as a Dative (to/for) or Locative (in/at/on) target.

1. Marking the indirect object (Dative function): Used for the object of bivalent intransitive verbs, or the recipient in ditransitive verbs.

	Adyghe				Kabardian			
Sentence:	КӀалэм мыӀэрысэр пшъашъэм реты.				ЩӀалэм мыӀэрысэр пщащэм ирет.			
Word:	КӀалэ-м	мыӀэрысэ-р	пшъашъэ-м	реты	ЩӀалэ-м	мыӀэрысэ-р	пщащэ-м	ирет
Gloss:	boy-ERG	apple-ABS	girl-OBL	gives to	boy-ERG	apple-ABS	girl-OBL	gives to
Function:	A	O	IO	VERB_{ditrans}	A	O	IO	VERB_{ditrans}
Translation:	"The boy gives the apple to the girl."							

2. Marking Spatial/Temporal Locative: Marks nouns that act as a physical location or time-frame.

	Adyghe			Kabardian		
Sentence:	ЦӀыфыр чэщым мэчъые.			ЦIыхур жэщым мэжей.		
Word:	ЦӀыфы-р	чэщы-м	мэчъые	ЦIыху-р	жэщы-м	мэжей
Gloss:	person-ABS	night-OBL	sleeps	person-ABS	night-OBL	sleeps
Function:	S	TIME	VERB_{intrans}	S	TIME	VERB_{intrans}
Translation:	"The person sleeps at night."					

=== Instrumental–directional case (-мкӀэ / -кӀэ) ===
A descriptive case indicating the means, instrument, or direction of an action.

1. Marking the instrument or means of action
	Adyghe			Kabardian		
Sentence:	ЫцӀэр къэлэмымкӀэ къытхыгъ.			ИцIэр къэрэндащымкIэ итхащ.		
Word:	Ы-цӀэ-р	къэлэмы-мкӀэ	къытхыгъ	И-цIэ-р	къэрэндащы-мкIэ	итхащ
Gloss:	his-name-ABS	pencil-INS	he wrote	his-name-ABS	pencil-INS	he wrote
Function:	O	INS	VERB_{trans}	O	INS	VERB_{trans}
Translation:	"He wrote his name with the pencil."					

2. Marking the direction of action / general location
	Adyghe			Kabardian		
Sentence:	Тэ къуаджэмкӀэ тэкӀо.			Дэ къуажэмкӀэ докӀуэ.		
Word:	Тэ	къуаджэ-мкӀэ	тэкӀо	Дэ	къуажэ-мкӀэ	докӀуэ
Gloss:	We	village-DIR	are going	We	village-DIR	are going
Function:	S	DIR	VERB_{intrans}	S	DIR	VERB_{intrans}
Translation:	"We are going toward the village."					

=== Adverbial case (-эу / -у) ===
Transforms the noun into an adverbial modifier. It translates closely to the English word "as" or "in the capacity of" (e.g., ЛӀыр профессор-эу хъуащ — 'The man became a professor'). It also functions similarly to English relative pronouns ("that", "who", "whom") to subordinate a descriptive clause (e.g., Ady: кӀалэ-у макӀорэ / Kab: щIалэ-у кIуэр — 'the boy who goes').

== Pronoun dropping ==
Circassian is a pro-drop language, or "pronoun dropping" language, which is a language that may omit certain pronoun classes. The subject and the object pronouns are frequently omitted because verb conjugations reflect number and person.

Example sentences with dropped pronouns
Pattern	Adyghe	Kabardian	Translation
Both mentioned	кӀалэм пшъашъэр елъэгъу	щӀалэм пщащэр елъэгъу	"the boy is seeing the girl"
Object dropped	кӀалэм елъэгъу	щӀалэм елъэгъу	"the boy is seeing him/her/it"
Subject dropped	пшъашъэр елъэгъу	пщащэр елъэгъу	"(s)he is seeing the girl"
Both dropped	елъэгъу	елъэгъу	"(s)he is seeing him/her/it"

== Noun and adjective ==
If a noun is accompanied by an adjective, the adjective is placed after the noun and it takes the noun case suffix instead of the noun itself.

Absolutive case
	Adyghe			Kabardian		
Sentence:	Пшъэшъэ дахэр макӀо.			Пщэщэ дахэр макӀуэ.		
Word:	Пшъэшъэ	дахэ-р	макӀо	Пщэщэ	дахэ-р	макӀуэ
Gloss:	girl	pretty-ABS	is going	girl	pretty-ABS	is going
Translation:	"The pretty girl is going."					

Ergative case
	Adyghe				Kabardian			
Sentence:	КӀалэ кӀыхьэм мыер ешхы.				ЩӀалэ кӀыхьэм мыӀэрысэ ешхы.			
Word:	КӀалэ	кӀыхьэ-м	мые-р (implied)	ешхы	ЩӀалэ	кӀыхьэ-м	мыӀэрысэ-р (implied)	ешхы
Gloss:	boy	tall-ERG	apple-ABS	is eating	boy	tall-ERG	apple-ABS	is eating
Translation:	"The tall boy is eating the apple."							

Instrumental case
	Adyghe			Kabardian		
Sentence:	Къэлэм папцӀэмкӀэ сэтхэ.			Къэрэндащ папцӀэмкӀэ сотхэ.		
Word:	Къэлэм	папцӀэ-мкӀэ	сэтхэ	Къэрэндащ	папцӀэ-мкӀэ	сотхэ
Gloss:	pencil	sharp-INS	I am writing	pencil	sharp-INS	I am writing
Translation:	"I am writing with the sharp pencil."					

== Participle ==
Participles are verb forms that modify a noun or noun phrase. In Circassian, someone or something that performs a specific verb can be represented with the verb carrying an additional suffix.

- Adyghe: макӀо ('he is going') → кӀорэр ('the one who is going'); шхэх ('they are eating') → шхэхэрэр ('the ones who are eating').
- Kabardian: макӀуэ ('he is going') → кӀуэр ('the one who is going'); машхэх ('they are eating') → шхэхэр ('the ones who are eating').

== Possession ==
There are two ways to express possession:

- The prefix и- (jə) refers to the possessed object:
  - Adyghe: икӀалэ ('his/her boy').
  - Kabardian: ищIалэ ('his/her boy').
- The prefix зи- (zjə) refers to the possessor of the object:
  - Adyghe: зикӀалэ ('(s)he who owns the boy').
  - Kabardian: зищIалэ ('(s)he who owns the boy').

== Creating nouns from adjectives ==
An adjective can function as a noun by taking the standard noun case suffixes (absolutive, ergative, etc.).

- Absolutive: дахэ ('pretty') → дахэр ('the pretty person'); Ady. ашӀу / Kab. ӀэфӀ ('tasty') → ашӀухэр / ӀэфӀэр ('the tasty ones').
- Ergative: Ady. чъыӀэ / Kab. щӀыӀэ ('cold') → чъыӀэм / щӀыӀэм ('in the cold').

Furthermore, any adjective that is measurable or comparable can be turned into an abstract noun by adding the suffix -агъэ (Adyghe) or -агъ(э) (Kabardian).

- дахэ ('pretty') → дахагъэ ('beauty').
- псынкӀэ ('fast') → псынкӀагъэ ('speed').

== Derivation ==
Derivation is the formation of a new word on the basis of an existing word or words. Composition and suffixation are the most typical ways to form Circassian nouns. There are different ways of composing words, for example: мэзчэ́т (мэз 'forest', чэт 'chicken' – pheasant), псычэ́т (псы 'water', чэт 'chicken' – duck), мэкъумэ́щ ('agriculture' – мэкъу 'hay', мэщы́ 'millet'), шхапӀэ ('cafeteria' – шхэн 'eat', пӀэ 'place').

Example suffixes that are highly productive for deriving nouns based on semantic categories
Translation	Suffix (Adyghe / Kabardian)	Adyghe	Kabardian
Manner	-кӀэ / -кIэ	зекӀуакӀэ 'behavior', кӀуакӀэ 'gait'	зекIуэкIэ 'behavior', кIуэкIэ 'gait'
Time	-гъу / -гъуэ	хьадэгъу 'death time', къэщэгъу 'age of marriage'	хьэдэгъуэ 'death time', къэшэгъуэ 'age of marriage'
Fellow	-гъу / -гъу	лъэпкъэгъу 'kinsman', ныбджэгъу 'friend'	лъэпкъэгъу 'kinsman', ныбжьэгъу 'friend'
Place	-щ / -щ	хьакӀэщ 'sitting-room' (from хьакӀэ 'guest'), чэмэщ 'cowshed' (from чэмы 'cow')	хьэщIэщ 'sitting-room' (from хьэщIэ 'guest'), жэмыщ 'cowshed' (from жэм 'cow')
Location	-пӀэ / -пIэ	еджапӀэ 'school' (from еджэн), уцупӀэ 'station' (from уцун 'to stop')	еджапIэ 'school' (from еджэн), увыпIэ 'station' (from увын 'to stop')
Agent	-кӀо / -кIуэ	еджакӀо 'student', лэжьакӀо 'worker'	еджакIуэ 'student', лэжьакIуэ 'worker'
Tool (Container)	-лъ / -лъ	щыгъулъ 'saltcellar' (from щыгъу 'salt'), дэгъалъ 'vessel for oil'	шыгъулъ 'saltcellar' (from шыгъу 'salt'), дагъэлъ 'vessel for oil'
Tool (Material)	-пхъэ / -пхъэ	чылапхъэ 'seed', гъомылапхъэ 'foodstuffs'	жылапхъэ 'seed', гъэмылапхъэ 'foodstuffs'
Horrible	-джэ / -джэ	кӀуаджэ 'bad road' (from кӀон 'to go'), теплъаджэ 'ugly'	кIуэджэ 'bad road' (from кIуэджэ 'to go'), теплъэджэ 'ugly'
