= Adverbial case =

Grammatical case

The adverbial case (abbreviated ADV) is a noun case in Abkhaz and Georgian with a function similar to that of the translative and essive cases in Finnic languages. It is also featured in Udmurt.

The term is sometimes used to refer to the ablative case of other languages.

== Examples ==
In Georgian, the adverbial case has several functions. Its most common usage is to derive adverbs from adjectives, like in English:

Pianinoze kargad ukravs ("He/she plays the piano well")

The adverbial case suffix is -ad.

The adverbial case can also act as the essive case:

Masc'avleblad mushaobs ("He works as a teacher")

The adverbial case also used in stating the name of a language:

Inglisurad lap'arakobs ("(S)he speaks English") Germanulad gadatargmna ("(S)he translated it to German")

With the passive future participle in sa-, the adverbial case often forms purposive or infinitival-like constructions:

Usatuod shevecdebi biletebi vishovo mag p'iesis sanaxavad ("Without a doubt I will try to get tickets to see this play.")
