= Qat (deity) =

Principal god in the oral mythology of the Banks Islands, northern Vanuatu

Qat (or Qet, Kpwet, Iqet, Ikpwet etc. – see below) is the principal god in the oral mythology of the Banks Islands, a small archipelago of northern Vanuatu, Melanesia.

Although Qat was never formally worshipped as a deity, the folklore of these once animist populations traditionally referred, and still does, to Qat as the spirit to whom we humans owe several elements of our culture: the world itself (in the form of the Torres and Banks archipelagoes); Night; Death; women; marriage rules and incest prohibition; as well as the song language in use throughout the area, locally known as "the language of Qat".

This mythological figure has connections with the god known as Tagaro in other parts of Vanuatu.

== Name ==
The deity is called Qat (pronounced [k͡pʷat]) in Mota, an Oceanic language which was first documented by Robert Codrington at the end of the 19th century.

The same hero is known under the same name in the languages of neighboring Banks Islands, albeit with different pronunciations (due to historical processes of sound change): Qēt [k͡pʷɪt] in Löyöp, Q̄et [ᵑᵐɡ͡bʷɛt] in Volow, Iqet [iˈk͡pʷɛt] in Mwotlap, Qet [k͡pʷɛt] in Lemerig, Vurës, and Mwesen, Qo’ [k͡pʷɔʔ] in Vera'a, Qat [k͡pʷat] in Nume and Lakon, Qāt [k͡pʷaːt] in Dorig, and Qet [kʷɛt] in Mwerlap. All these forms are derived from an ancestral name that can be reconstructed as *ᵐbʷatu in Proto-Torres–Banks – bearing etymological connections with secret societies of initiation, and to a ritual dance associated with ancestral spirits.

The neighboring Torres Islands have a mythological hero with a very similar history, yet give him names unrelated to the root *ᵐbʷatu: Mer̄avtit [məg͡ʟaβˈtit] in Hiw and Merawehih [mərawəˈhih] in Lo-Toga. In these two languages, the etymon appears to be *marawasisi, probably a compound of *marawa "spider" (also the name of a spirit), with a second element that might be *sisi "to pierce".

== Mythology ==
In the Mota version, Qat was born when his Father, a stone, exploded. He has eleven brothers, all called Tagaro [taɣaro] (Tagaro the Foolish, Tagaro the Wise, etc.), and a companion, Marawa [marawa], who takes the form of a spider as the name suggests.

Along with creating islands and covering them with plant and animal life, Qat made the first three pairs of men and women by carving them from dracaena wood and then playing drums to make them dance, bringing them to life through music. One story recounts how Marawa, envious of Qat's creations, carved his own figures and brought them to life, but then grew tired of them and buried them for a week. When he dug them up, they had rotted, and this is how death came to be.

When his brothers became tired of daylight, Qat created night and taught his brothers how to sleep. When they had slept enough he took a piece of red obsidian and sliced through Night, thus making Dawn.

One day Qat came upon a group of sky maidens who had taken off their wings to bathe. He quickly buried one pair of wings so that one girl, Vinmara, had to remain behind, and in time she became his wife, now called Ro-Lei. They lived together until one day Qat's mother reproached her daughter-in-law and made her cry. Ro-Lei's tears washed away the earth which covered her wings; she put them on and flew away. Qat shot an arrow with a rope tied to it into the roots of a great banyan tree in the sky and climbed after her into the sky world, but later as he climbed down with Ro-Lei, the root snapped and he plunged to his death, while she flew safely away.

In other versions of the story, Qat does not die but sails away in a canoe, promising to return one day.

Friedrich Ratzel, in The History of Mankind, Vol. 1 (1896), provides another version of the story as follows:

"…among the Banks Islanders the supreme god, Qat, emerges from a stone, which was his mother; and then with the help of his companion, Marawa, creates the rest of the world. Marawa is invoked with Qat in all emergencies, and may easily be recognised as the legendary Maui of New Zealand and Hawaii. Qat was doomed to be slain, but succeeded in climbing a nutmeg-tree. He had hardly reached the top when, by the arts of his hostile brothers, the tree grew higher and higher, and became of such circumference that Qat could not have got down again, had not Marawa, seeing his friend's difficulty, blown to earth a thread, or a hair from his head."

Nowadays, the story of Qat which is most popular among the islanders of northern Vanuatu tells how Qat, in Vanua Lava, built his canoe with the help of the spider spirit Marawa; how the canoe was then stolen by Qat's eleven brothers, who sailed it to the nearby island of Gaua; and how they all had to defeat the giant of that island, Qasavara.

== Access to some narratives ==
The following archives, recorded by linguist A. François in the Torres and Banks Islands (Vanuatu), present various stories from the mythological cycle of Qat. Each reference features an audio recording, its transcription in the original language, and sometimes one or more translations:

Storyteller	Title & link	Language	Translation(s)
Moses Steven Weting	“Kpwat and his brothers against the Ogre”	Lakon	English
Taitus Lōlō	“Ikpwet brings back the Night”	Mwotlap	French
Tevēt Mesigteltōk	“The legend of Kpwet, the Trickster God”	Mwesen	French, English
Tevēt Mesigteltōk	“Selected stories of Kpwet”	Mwesen	—
Wolta Robin	“Kpwet and his brothers against the Ogre”	Lemerig	—
Aisak Rōn̄rōriw	“Merawehih creates Night and Day”	Lo-Toga	—
Mama Jimmy Tiwyoy	“Megravtit and his brothers against the Ogre”	Hiw	—

== See also ==
- Warohunugamwanehaora
