= Ureparapara =

Island of Vanuatu

Coordinates: 13°32′S 167°20′E

Native name: Noypēypay, Aö
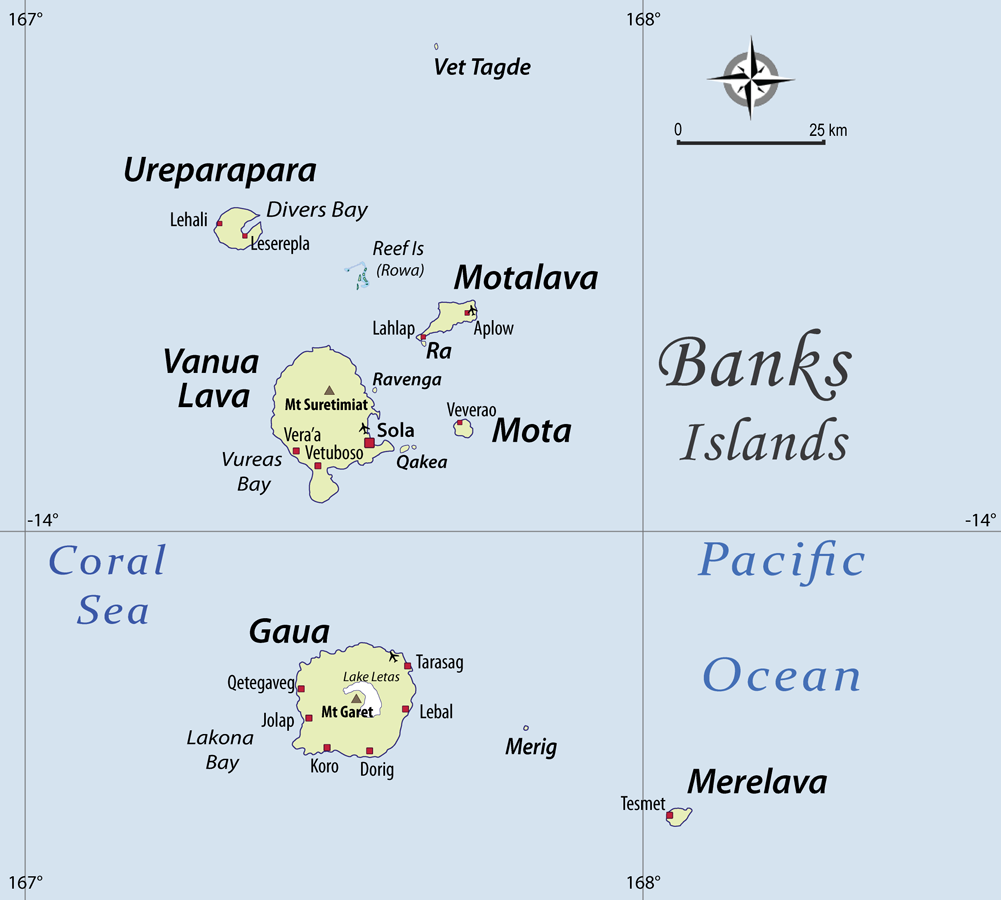
- Ureparapara, in the Banks Islands

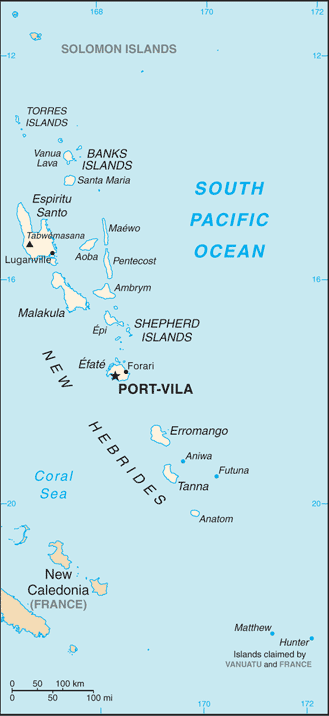

Geography
- Location: Pacific Ocean
- Archipelago: Vanuatu, Banks Islands
- Area: 39 km^{2} (15 sq mi)
- Highest elevation: 300 m (1000 ft)
- Highest point: Mt Qusetowqas

Administration
- Vanuatu
- Province: Torba Province

Demographics
- Population: 437 (2009)

Ureparapara (also known as Parapara for short; once known as Bligh Island) is the third largest island in the Banks group of northern Vanuatu, after Gaua and Vanua Lava.

The climate on the island is humid tropical. The average annual rainfall exceeds 4000 mm. Ureparapara is subject to frequent earthquakes and cyclones.

== Geography ==
Ureparapara island is an old volcanic cone that has been breached by the sea on its east coast. The resulting bay is known as Divers' Bay, and as Löyöp [løjøp] in the local language of the same name.

Apart from this indentation, the island is circular in shape, with a diameter of fifteen kilometres (9.3 miles). The land area is 39 square kilometres (15 square miles).

== History ==
The first recorded European who arrived to Ureparapara was the Spanish explorer Pedro Fernández de Quirós on 15 June 1606. He first named the island Pilar de Zaragoza; however, later on, it is charted as Nuestra Señora de Montserrate both by him and his chaplain Fray Martin de Munilla.

In 1789, the island was rediscovered by William Bligh, during his journey from Tonga to Timor after the mutiny on the Bounty. After this, Ureparapara was known for a while under the name Bligh Island.

== Population and culture ==
=== Population ===
The population was 437 in 2009. There are three villages on the island. The main village is Lear. The others are Lehali (on the west coast) and Leqyangle.

=== Languages ===
Two languages are spoken on the island: Lehali and Löyöp, with respectively 200 and 240 speakers.

In his 1885 survey of the region's language varieties, the missionary and linguist Robert Codrington described the island as being home to two language varieties, which he calls Retan in the West and the Bay in the East. Comparison of his description with modern data shows that Retan was the same language as modern Lehali; whereas the Bay was apparently the ancestor of Löyöp (also called Divers Bay today).

Codrington treats Retan and the Bay as if they were two dialects of a single language, which he calls Norbarbar; however, the many differences he quotes between them suggest they might as well have been treated as two distinct languages. A more recent survey by linguist A. François confirms that these are two separate languages.

Oral history on Ureparapara, as cited by various sources, reports that the current population of the Bay (Löyöp speakers) includes descendants of refugees who were native to the nearby Reef islands: they were forced to migrate to Ureparapara by an event that is described sometimes as a tsunami in the 1930s, or a cyclone in the 1950s. It is likely that the modern Löyöp language results from the merger of two language varieties: the original dialect of the Bay as described by Codrington (1885), and the one originally spoken on Rowa – now a deserted archipelago.

A 2014 glottometric study of the Banks islands has shown that Löyöp is close to Mwotlap and Volow, whereas Lehali shares elements both with Löyöp and with Lo-Toga in the Torres Islands.

=== Name of the island ===
The name Ureparapara [ureparapara] reflects the way the island is named in the language of Mota, which was once chosen by missionaries, at the end of the 19th century, as the reference language for the area.

The island is locally named Noypēypay [nɔjpɪjˈpaj] in Lehali and Aö [aˈø] in Löyöp. Other names for the island include Mwotlap Nōybaybay [nʊjᵐbajᵐbaj], Vurës Ōrbarbar [orᵐbarˈᵐbar], Vera'a Urbarbara [urᵐbarᵐbara], and Lakon Ōlpaapaa [ʊlpaːˈpaː]. Except for the Löyöp term (of unknown origin), the names descend from a Proto-Torres-Banks *[na] ureᵐbaraᵐbara, which may be understood as "the island of slopes" (Proto-Torres-Banks *ure "island" has cognates such as Tamambo ure [ˈure]). The name Norbarbar, reported by Codrington for the island, is also of the same origin.

=== Historical sites ===
Ureparapara is known to host historical sites made of coral stone, named nowon and votwos in Lehali. These ancestral villages, located inland in the forest, were abandoned in the 19th century, yet have been preserved under the vegetation; they have been proposed for inclusion amongst the World Heritage sites of UNESCO. One of the most famous sites is a 12-feet high stone platform called Votwos. These used to serve as a ceremonial platform for the high-profile grade-taking ceremonies, known as sok or nsok in Lehali, and referred to in the anthropological literature as suqe or sukwe (after their name in Mota).

These sites are now only visited for ceremonial purposes, as most people nowadays live along the coast.

== Bibliography ==
- Codrington, Robert Henry (1885). The Melanesian Languages. Vol. 47. Oxford: Clarendon Press. pp. 25–60.
- François, Alexandre (2012), "The dynamics of linguistic diversity: Egalitarian multilingualism and power imbalance among northern Vanuatu languages" (PDF), International Journal of the Sociology of Language, 2012 (214): 85–110, doi:10.1515/ijsl-2012-0022, S2CID 145208588
- François, Alexandre (2013), "Shadows of bygone lives: The histories of spiritual words in northern Vanuatu" (PDF), in Mailhammer, Robert (ed.), Lexical and structural etymology: Beyond word histories, Studies in Language Change, vol. 11, Berlin: DeGruyter Mouton, pp. 185–244, ISBN 978-1-61451-058-1
- François, Alexandre (2014), "Trees, Waves and Linkages: Models of Language Diversification", in Bowern, Claire; Evans, Bethwyn (eds.), The Routledge Handbook of Historical Linguistics, London: Routledge, pp. 161–189, ISBN 978-0-41552-789-7
- François, Alexandre; Franjieh, Michael; Lacrampe, Sébastien; Schnell, Stefan (2015), "The exceptional linguistic density of Vanuatu", in François, Alexandre; Lacrampe, Sébastien; Franjieh, Michael; Schnell, Stefan (eds.), The Languages of Vanuatu: Unity and Diversity, Studies in the Languages of Island Melanesia, Canberra: Asia Pacific Linguistics Open Access, pp. 1–21, ISBN 9781922185235
- Tryon, D.T. (1972). "The languages of the New Hebrides: A checklist and general survey". In Beaumont, C.; Tryon, D. T.; Wurm, S. A. (eds.). Papers in Linguistics of Melanesia, Series A-33. Pacific Linguistics.
- Vienne, Bernard (1984). Gens de Motlav - Idéologie et pratique sociale en Mélanésie. Société des Océanistes. Paris: ORSTOM.
- "Ureparapara". Global Volcanism Program. Smithsonian Institution.
