= Lemerig language =

Austronesian language spoken in Vanuatu

Lemerig
- Pak, Päk, Sasar
- Pronunciation: [lɪmɪˈriɣ]
- Native to: Vanuatu
- Region: Vanua Lava
- Native speakers: 2 (2010)
- Language family: Austronesian: Malayo-Polynesian; Oceanic; Southern Oceanic; North-Central Vanuatu; North Vanuatu; Torres-Banks; Lemerig
- Dialects: Alo-Teqel; Päk; Sasar

Language codes
- ISO 639-3: lrz
- Glottolog: leme1238
- ELP: Lemerig
- Lemerig is classified as Critically Endangered by the UNESCO Atlas of the World's Languages in Danger.

One of the two remaining speakers of Lemerig, a man from the village of Lalngetak, speaking the Päk dialect, recorded in Vanua Lava, Vanuatu

Lemerig is an Oceanic language spoken on Vanua Lava, in Vanuatu.

The language is no longer actively spoken, having receded in favour of its neighbors, including Vera'a and possibly also Mwotlap or Vurës. Two remaining speakers live on the northern coast of the island.

== Name ==
The name Lemerig refers to a now abandoned village in northern Vanua Lava; it is spelled Lēmērig [lɪmɪˈriɣ] in the language of the same name. It reflects an earlier Proto-Torres-Banks form *lemeriɣi, where the *riɣi component likely means "small".

== Dialects ==
Lemerig has sometimes been referred to using the names of its local varieties: Päk, (Note: Päk [pæk] is a village on the north coast of Vanua Lava island, today often referred to using its Mwotlap name Abek [aᵐbɛk] (with locative). Due to its vowel [æ] (potentially ambiguous to Western ears), the original name in Lemerig was spelled Pak in Codrington 1885 (pp.39 sqq), but Pek in Codrington 1891 (p.81).) Sasar, and Alo-Teqel.

Judging from wordlists published by missionary and linguist Robert Codrington, these three varieties were very close to each other. The little differences there were went extinct during the 20th century.

== Phonology ==
Lemerig has 11 phonemic vowels. These are all short monophthongs /i ɪ ɛ æ a œ ø ɒ̝ ɔ ʊ u/.

Lemerig vowels
	Front		Back
	plain	round	Back
Close	i ⟨i⟩		u ⟨u⟩
Near-close	ɪ ⟨ē⟩	ø ⟨ö⟩	ʊ ⟨ō⟩
Open-mid	ɛ ⟨e⟩	œ ⟨ë⟩	ɔ ⟨o⟩
Near-open	æ ⟨ä⟩		ɒ̝ ⟨ā⟩
Open	a ⟨a⟩		

== Grammar ==
The system of personal pronouns in Lemerig contrasts clusivity, and distinguishes four numbers (singular, dual, trial, and plural).

Most negative morphemes are discontinuous, wrapped around the predicate phrase: e.g. /(ɛʔ) … (k͡pʷæl) ʔæ/ (Negative realis ‘did~does not’), /(ɛʔ) … ʔæ kiʔi(s)/ (Nondumitive ‘not yet’), /mɛ … ŋ͡mʷæs-ʔæ/ (Negative potential ‘cannot’). Historically, this pattern reflects an instance of Jespersen's cycle.

Spatial reference in Lemerig is based on a system of geocentric (absolute) directionals, which is in part typical of Oceanic languages, in part innovative.

== Bibliography ==
- Codrington, Robert Henry (1885). The Melanesian Languages. Vol. 47. Oxford: Clarendon Press. pp. 25–60.
- Codrington, Robert Henry (1891). The Melanesians: Studies in Their Anthropology and Folk-lore. New York: Clarendon Press. ISBN 9780486202587.
- François, Alexandre (2011). "Social ecology and language history in the northern Vanuatu linkage: A tale of divergence and convergence" (PDF). Journal of Historical Linguistics. 1 (2): 175–246. doi:10.1075/jhl.1.2.03fra. hdl:1885/29283. S2CID 42217419.
- —— (2012). "The dynamics of linguistic diversity: Egalitarian multilingualism and power imbalance among northern Vanuatu languages" (PDF). International Journal of the Sociology of Language (214): 85–110. doi:10.1515/ijsl-2012-0022. S2CID 145208588.
- —— (2015). "The ins and outs of up and down: Disentangling the nine geocentric space systems of Torres and Banks languages" (PDF). In François, Alexandre; Lacrampe, Sébastien; Franjieh, Michael; Schnell, Stefan (eds.). The languages of Vanuatu: Unity and diversity. Studies in the Languages of Island Melanesia. Canberra: Asia-Pacific Linguistics. pp. 137–195. ISBN 978-1-922185-23-5.
- —— (2016). "The historical morphology of personal pronouns in northern Vanuatu" (PDF). In Pozdniakov, Konstantin (ed.). Comparatisme et reconstruction : tendances actuelles. Faits de Langues. Vol. 47. Bern: Peter Lang. pp. 25–60.
- —— (2021). "Presentation of the Lemerig language and audio archive". Pangloss Collection. Paris: CNRS.
- —— (2026). "Negation in Dorig" (PDF). In Miestamo, Matti; Veselinova, Ljuba (eds.). Negation in the World's Languages. Research on Comparative Grammar 9. Vol. 3. Berlin: Language Science Press. pp. 73–128. doi:10.5281/zenodo.18234067. ISBN 978-3-96110-554-0.
- François, Alexandre; Sërortēlsöm, Taitus (2006). Nvāv ʻām ʻa Lēmērig — Storian long lanwis blong Lemerig (Vanua Lava, Banks, Vanuatu) (PDF) (in Lemerig and Bislama). – Collection of stories from the oral tradition; text in Lemerig and introduction in Bislama
