= Proto-Torres–Banks language =

Reconstructed ancestor of the Torres–Banks languages

Proto-Torres–Banks
- PTB
- Reconstruction of: Torres–Banks languages
- Region: Torres and Banks Islands
- Era: after 1000 BCE
- Reconstructed ancestors: Proto-Austronesian: Proto-Malayo-Polynesian; Proto-Oceanic; Proto-Central–Eastern Oceanic; Proto-Southern Oceanic; Proto-North-Central Vanuatu; Proto-North Vanuatu

Proto-Torres–Banks (PTB) is the reconstructed ancestor of the seventeen languages of the Torres and Banks Islands of Vanuatu. Like all indigenous languages of Vanuatu, it belongs to the Oceanic branch of the Austronesian languages.

More specifically, it is the shared ancestor of the following modern languages (ranked geographically, from NW to SE): Hiw, Lo-Toga, Lehali, Löyöp, Volow, Mwotlap, Lemerig, Vera'a, Vurës, Mwesen, Mota, Nume, Dorig, Koro, Olrat, Lakon, and Mwerlap.

== Reconstruction ==
Proto-Torres–Banks, as reconstructed with the comparative method from the attested daughter languages, evidently represented an early, mutually intelligible chain of Oceanic dialects in the northern part of Vanuatu starting from 1000 BCE after Lapita settlement of the archipelago, as evidenced by the pattern of loss and retention of the Proto-Oceanic phoneme *R, which merged with *r in the early history of the North-Central Vanuatu dialect chain. It therefore is not a "true" proto-language in the sense of an undifferentiated language ancestral to all Torres–Banks languages, but rather a part of the early North-Central Vanuatu linkage with some dialectal variation across different island groups, before they eventually disintegrated into mutually unintelligible languages.

Elements of the proto-language have been proposed by linguist Alexandre François: vowels and consonants, personal pronouns, space system, vocabulary.

== Phonology ==
=== Phoneme inventory ===
Proto-Torres–Banks had 5 phonemic vowels, /i e a o u/, and 16 consonants:

Vowels
	Front	Back
Close	*i	*u
Close-mid	*e	*o
Open	*a	

Consonants
		Labiovelar	Bilabial	Alveolar	Dorsal
Nasal		*mʷ	*m	*n	*ŋ
Stop	voiceless			*t	
Stop	prenasalized	*ᵐbʷ	*ᵐb	*ⁿd	*ᵑg
Fricative			*β ⟨v⟩	*s	*ɣ
Approximant		*w		*l, *r	*j

Following the loss of final POc consonants (or dialectal addition of a paragogic vowel), syllable structure in Proto-Torres–Banks was open, i.e. (C)V with optional consonant: e.g. POc *quraŋ "crayfish" > PTB *ura ~ *uraŋi; POc *matiruʀ "to sleep" > PTB *matiru; POc *laŋit "sky" > PTB *laŋi "wind". No descendant language preserves this situation today, but it can still be found in other related languages such as Gela and Uneapa.

Stress fell on the penultimate syllable. Following the pervasive loss of final vowels, descendant languages usually have stress on the final syllable. Vera'a and Mota have lost stress entirely.

=== Evolution of vowels ===
In all of the descendant languages except for Mota, vowel hybridization occurred (a form of metaphony or umlaut). Later, a process of vowel deletion took place whereby every second vowel, being unstressed, was dropped: this resulted in an increase in the number of vowel phonemes – a process known as transphonologization. For example, PTB *laŋi "wind" > HIW [jɔŋ], MTP [lɛŋ], giving rise to phonemes /ɔ/ and /ɛ/ respectively. Words which initially had 4 syllables were reduced to 2 syllables (e.g. POc *RapiRapi "evening" > PTB *raβiˈraβi > MSN /rɛβrɛβ/ [rɛɸˈrɛɸ]); *CVCV disyllables were reduced to a single CVC syllable (e.g. POc *roŋoR "to hear" > PTB *roŋo > LKN /rɔŋ/); words with 3 syllables ended up with 2, including *CVCVV which became *CVCV (e.g. POc *panua "island, land" > PTB *βanua > LKN /βanʊ/).

In Mota, only single high vowels were dropped, evident even in the earliest records: e.g. *tolu "three" > /tol/. In the 1880s, Codrington reported cases when Mota had preserved high vowels (e.g. /siwo/ "down"; /tolu/ "three"), which have since disappeared from today's Mota (e.g. /swo/; /tol/).

In Hiw, Lo-Toga and Vera'a, the final vowel was retained as a schwa when it was originally lower than the one under stress: e.g. POc *ikan "fish" > PTB *íɣa > HIW /ɪɣə/, LTG /iɣə/. In Vera'a, the schwa became an echo vowel, e.g. POc *pulan "moon" > PTB *βula > *βulə > VRA /fulʊ/; that final vowel in Vera'a can disappear in phrase-medial position, yielding the form /ful/ for 'moon'.

In trisyllabic words, the first vowel tends to be deleted or copied after the second vowel, with the exception of Mota and Lakon, which preserve them. Thus, POc *panua "island, land" > PTB *βanua > LKN /βanʊ/, but MSN /βʊnʊ/.

=== Examples of reconstructions ===
PTB reconstruction	meaning	reflexes	Proto-Oceanic etymon	source
*[n]iᵑgo	‘2sg. pronoun, thou’	(1) *iᵑgo > HIW /ikə/ (2) *niᵑgo > LTG /nikə/, LHI /nɛk/, LYP /niŋ/, VLW /nɪŋ/, MTP /nɪk/, LMG /næk/, VRA /nikɪ/, VRS /nɪk/, MSN /nɪk/, MTA /niko/, NUM /nik/, DRG /nɪk/, KRO /nɪk/, OLR /nɪk/, LKN /nɪk/, MRL /nɛ͡ak/	*[i]ko[e] "thou"	François 2016: 33
*lolomarani	‘wise, intelligent; wisdom, knowledge’	HIW /jɵjməg͡ʟen/ ‘smart; to know’, LTG /lolmərɛn/ ‘smart; to know’, LHI /lɛlməjæn/, LYP /lɔlmɛjɛn/, VLW /lɔlmɛjɛn/, MTP /lɔlmɛjɛn/, LMG /lɪlmɛrɛn/, VRA /lʊlmaran/, VRS /lʊlʊmɛrɛn/, MSN /lɔlmɛrɛn/, MTA /lolomaran/, DRG /llɔmraːn/, LKN /lɔlmaːræn/, MRL /lɔlmɛrɛn/	*lalom "inside" + *ma-Raqani "daylight"	François 2013: 208
*rowo	‘dash, escape; out; seawards’	HIW /g͡ʟow/, LTG /row/, LHI /jɔw/, LYP /jɔw/, VLW /jɔ/, MTP /jɔw/, LMG /rɔw/, VRA /rʊw/, VRS /rʊw/, MSN /rɔw/, MTA /rowo/, NUM /rɔw/ ‘dash+’, DRG /rɔw/ ‘dash+’, KRO /rɔw/ ‘dash+’, OLR /rɔw/ ‘dash+’, LKN /rɔw/ ‘dash+’, MRL /rɔw/	*Ropok ‘dash, fly’	François 2015: 191
*salaɣoro	‘secret; secret meeting place in the bush for men during initiation rituals’	LTG /hɔləɣor/, LHI /n-halɣɛj/, LYP /n-salɣoj/, VLW /n-halɣoj/, MTP /na-halɣoj/, LMG /n-sɒlɣœr/, VRA /salɣʊr/, VRS /salɣʊr/, MSN /salɣɔr/, MTA /salaɣoro/, NUM /salɔwɔr/, DRG /salɣɔr/, KRO /salɣɔr/, OLR /salwɔj/, LKN /salwɔː/	*jalan "road" + PNCV *koro "obstruct"	François 2005: 499
*s[i,u]wo	‘down; northwest’	(1) *siwo > HIW /hiw/ "Hiw (island)", LTG /iw/, MTA /siwo/ (modern /swo/) (2) *suwo > HIW /ʉw/, LHI /hɔw/, LYP /sʊw/, VLW /hʊ/, MTP /hʊw/, LMG /sʊw/, VRA /suwʊ/, VRS /sʊw/, MSN /sʊw/, LKN /hʊw/, MRL /sʊw/	*sipo "down"	François 2015: 190
*totoɣale	‘notch (wood), carve an effigy; effigy, image’	MTP /nɔ-tɔtɣal/, LMG /ʔɔɣal/, VRA /ʔʊɣal/, VRS /tʊtɣi͡al/, MTA /totoɣale/, LKN /tɔtɣæl/, MRL /nɛ-tɛtɣɛl/	*toto(k) "cut" + PNCV *kale "deceive"	François 2013: 198

== Regular sound changes from Proto-Oceanic ==
The historical sound changes that took place from Proto-Oceanic (POc) to Proto-Torres–Banks (PTB) were intricate, yet largely regular. Some have been reconstructed explicitly, whether on vowels or on consonants; others are implicit in published lists of PTB lexical reconstructions.

Pervasive phonological sound changes include:

- The loss of all final POc consonants, such as POc *manuk "bird" > PTB *manu. This sound change resulted in the language having only open syllables.
- The labialization of POc *p, *ᵐb and *m before *o or *u, resulting in PTB *w (< *βʷ), *ᵐbʷ and *mʷ (especially in Torres and northern Banks languages).

Considering each POc proto-phoneme sequentially, the PTB reflexes can be listed in the following table.

POc	PTB reflex	Comments	Examples	Source
*pʷ	*βʷ > *w	> /w/ in all daughter languages.	POc *puia "good" > *pʷia > *βʷia > PTB *wia > HIW /wi̯ə/, LTG /⟨ɣɛ-wi̯ə/, VLW /⟨ɣɛ-wɪ/, MTP /wɪ/, LMG /wi/, VRA /wiɪ/, VRS /wɪ/, MSN /wɪ/, MTA /wia/, DRG /wɪ/, KRO /wɪ/, OLR /wɪ/, LKN /wɪ/, MRL /wɛ͡a/	
*p	*β	> /β/ in most daughter languages, except: /f/ in VRA. *β tends to become /w/ before *o or *u.	POc *panua "island, land" > PTB *βanua > HIW /βəniɵ/, LTG /βəniə/, LHI /n-βɔnɔ/, LYP /n-βʊnʊ/, VLW /n-βʊnʊ/,, MTP /na-pnʊ/, LMG /n-βʊnʊ/, VRA /funuʊ/, VRS /βono/, MSN /βʊnʊ/, MTA /βanua/, NUM /βunu/, DRG /βnʊ/, KRO /βʊnʊ/, OLR /βʊnʊ/, LKN /βanʊ/, MRL /βʊnʊ/	
*p	*w	Before a rounded vowel, *p > *β > *βʷ > /w/ often (though not always); mostly in northern languages	POc *poli "to buy" > *βoli > *βʷoli > PTB *woli > MTP /wɪl/, MTA /wol/; PTB *[β,βʷ]usi "hit, kill"; > (1) *βusi > VRA /fus/, VRS /βys/, MSN /βus/, MTA /βus/, LKN /βuh/, MRL /βus/ > (2) *βʷusi > *wusi > HIW /wu/, LTG /wuh/, VLW /wih/, MTP /wuh/	
*t	*t	> /t/ in all daughter languages, except: /ʔ/ in LMG and VRA /t͡ʃ/ in LYP before front vowels. *ti > /s/ in LTG and LKN.	POc *[qa]tamate "dead person" > PTB *[a]tamate "ghost, spirit" > HIW /təmet/, LTG /təmet/, LHI /n-təmat/, LYP /n-tamat/, VLW /n-tamat/, MTP /na-tmat/, LMG /ʔamaʔ/, VRA /ʔamaʔ/, VRS /timi͡at/, MSN /tamat/, MTA /tamate/, NUM /tamat/, DRG /tmat/, KRO /tamat/, OLR /tamat/ LKN /ætmæt/, MRL /nɛ-tɛmɛt/; POc *pati "four" > PTB *βati > HIW /βɔt/, LTG /βɛt/, LHI /βæt/, LYP /βɛt/, VLW /n-βɛt/, MTP /βɛt/, LMG /βɛʔ/, VRA /fɛʔ/, VRS /βɛt/, MSN /βɛt/, MTA /βat/, NUM /βat/, DRG /βaːt/, KRO /βɛ͡at/, OLR /βat/, LKN /βæs/, MRL /βɛt/	
*k	*ɣ	> /ɣ/ in all daughter languages, except: Before *o or *u, in some languages, *ɣ tends to become w. When *ɣ ended up in coda position in post-PTB syllables, it was lost regularly in LHI & LYP, and sporadically in VLW, NUM, KRO. In OLR, *ɣ was regularly lost in coda position and triggered compensatory lengthening of a preceding vowel.	POc *kutu > PTB *ɣutu "louse" > HIW /ɣit/, LTG /ɣʉt/, LHI /wut/, LHI /wut/, VLW /ni-ɣit/, MTP /ni-ɣit/, LMG /wuʔ/, VRA /wuʔ/, VRS /wyt/, MSN /wut/, MTA /wut/, NUM /wu-wut/, DRG /wut/, KRO /ɣut/, LKN /wut/, MRL /wut/; POc *sake "up" > PTB *saɣe > HIW /aɣ/, LTG /[i]aɣ/, LHI /ha/, LYP /sa/, VLW /ha/, MTP /haɣ/, LMG /saɣ/, VRA /saɣ/, VRS /si͡aɣ/, MSN /saɣ/, MTA /saɣe/, NUM /sa/, DRG /saɣ/, KRO /sa[ɣ]/, OLR /saː/, LKN /haɣ/, MRL /sɛ͡aɣ/	
*ᵐbʷ	*ᵐbʷ (>*ᵑᵐg͡bʷ)	> /ᵑᵐg͡bʷ/ in VLW /k͡pʷ/ in all Banks languages except VLW and MRL. /kʷ/ in HIW, LTG, LHI and MRL.	POc *ᵐbʷatu(k) "head" + -ᵑgu "my" > PTB *ᵐbʷatu-ᵑgu "my head" > *ᵑᵐg͡bʷatu-ᵑgu > HIW /kʷiti-k/, LTG /kʷətʉ-k/, LHI /n-kʷutu-k/, LYP /n-k͡pʷit͡ʃi-k/, VLW /n-ᵑᵐg͡bʷiti-ŋ/, MTP /ni-k͡pʷti-k/, LMG /n-k͡pʷiʔi-k/, VRA /k͡pʷiʔi-k/, VRS /k͡pʷøty-k/, MSN /k͡pʷutu-k/, MTA /k͡pʷatu-k/, NUM /na-k͡pʷutu-k/, DRG /na-k͡pʷtu-k/, KRO /k͡pʷutu-k/, OLR /k͡pʷutu-k/, LKN /k͡pʷatʊ-k/, MRL /nɞ-kʷɞtʉ-k/	
*ᵐb	*ᵐb	(in onset position of modern syllable) /ᵐb/ in VLW, MTP, VRA, VRS, NUM, DRG, KRO, MRL /p/ in HIW, LTG, LHI, LYP, LMG, MSN, MTA, OLR, LKN.	POc *ᵐbanic "wing" + -ᵑgu "my" > PTB *ᵐbani-ᵑgu "my hand; my wing" > HIW /pini-k/, LYP /pɛnɛ-k/, VLW /n-mɪnɪ-ŋ/, MTP /na-mnɪ-k/, LMG /pini-k/, VRA /ᵐbini-k/, VRS /ᵐbɛni-k/, MSN /pini-k/, MTA /pane-k/, NUM /ᵐbini-k/, DRG /na-ᵐbni-k/, KRO /ᵐbini-k/, LKN /panɪ-k/, MRL /ᵐbani-k/	
*ᵐb	*ᵐb	(in coda position of modern syllable) /ᵐb/ in DRG /m/ in LHI, LYP, MTP, VLW, VRA, VRS, NUM, KRO, MRL /p/ in HIW, LTG, LMG, MSN, MTA, OLR, LKN.	PTB *leᵐba "mud, muddy" > HIW /jepə/ “swamp”, LTG /lɛpə/ “swamp”, LHI /n-læm/ “swamp garden for taro”, LYP /n-lɛm/ “dirty, muddy”, MTP /lɛm/ “dirty, muddy”, MTA /lepa/, DRG /lɛᵐb/ “soil, ground”, OLR /lɛp/ “soil, ground”	
*ᵐb	*ᵐbʷ	*ᵐb before a rounded vowel. → same reflexes as with *ᵐbʷ.	POc *ᵐboŋi "night" > PTB *ᵐbʷoŋi > *ᵑᵐg͡bʷoŋi > HIW /kɵŋ/, LTG /kʷəŋ/, LHI /kʷɔŋ/, LYP /k͡pʷʊŋ/, VLW /n-ᵑᵐg͡bʷɪŋ/, MTP /k͡pʷʊŋ/, LMG /k͡pʷøŋ/, VRA /k͡pʷʊŋ/, VRS /k͡pʷøŋ/, MSN /k͡pʷʊŋ/, MTA /k͡pʷoŋ/, NUM /k͡pʷʊŋ/, DRG /k͡pʷʊŋ/, KRO /k͡pʷʊŋ/, LKN /k͡pʷɪŋ/, MRL /kʷʊŋ/	
*ⁿd / *ⁿdr	*ⁿd	(in onset position of modern syllable) /ⁿd/ in all Torres–Banks languages, except: /t/ in HIW and LMG /ʈ͡ʂ/ in LTG. /t͡ʃ/ in OLR and LKN /n/ in MSN and MTA	POc *ⁿdraRaq "blood" > PTB *ⁿdara > HIW /tag͡ʟə/, LTG /ʈ͡ʂarə/, LHI /n-ⁿdaj/, LYP /n-ⁿdaj/, VLW /n-ⁿdaj/, MTP /na-ⁿdaj/, LMG /tɒr/, VRA /ⁿdara/, VRS /ⁿdar/, MSN /nar/, MTA /nara/, NUM /ⁿdar/, DRG /ⁿdar/, KRO /ⁿdar/, OLR /t͡ʃaj/, LKN /t͡ʃæː/, MRL /na-ⁿdar/	
*ⁿd / *ⁿdr	*ⁿd	(in coda position of modern syllable) /ⁿd/ in DRG /t/ in HIW, LTG, LMG /t͡ʃ/ in OLR and LKN /n/ in all other Torres–Banks languages	POc *kita "1 incl:pl" > PTB *ɣiⁿda > HIW /titə/, LTG /ɣiʈ͡ʂə/, LHI /ɣɛn/, LYP /jɛn/, VLW /ɣɪn/, MTP /ɣɪn/, LMG /ɣæt/, VRA /ɣiⁿdɪ/, VRS /nin/, MSN /nin/, MTA /nina/, NUM /ɣin/, DRG /ɣɪⁿd/, KRO /ɣin/, OLR /ɣɪt͡ʃ/, LKN /ɣɪt͡ʃ/, MRL /ɣɛ͡an/; PTB *ⁿdiⁿdi “wall in; enclosure” > HIW /tit/, LTG /ʈ͡ʂit/, LYP /ⁿdin/, MTP /ⁿdin/, MTA /nin/; POc *roⁿdrom “think” > PTB *[ⁿdo]ⁿdo[mi]; > (1) *ⁿdomi > LTG /ʈ͡ʂo͡əm/, MTP /ⁿdɪm/, MTA /nom/, DRG /ⁿdʊm/, KRO /ⁿdʊm/ > (2) *ⁿdoⁿdo > HIW /tot/, LTG /ʈ͡ʂot/, LHI /ⁿdɛn/, LYP /ⁿdɔn/, VLW /ⁿdɔn/, LMG /tœt/ > (3) *ⁿdoⁿdomi > HIW /ttɵm/, LTG /ʈ͡ʂo͡əm/, VRA /ⁿdʊⁿdʊm/, VRS /ⁿdøⁿdøm/, MSN /nʊnʊm/, MTA /nonom/, NUM /ⁿdʊⁿdʊm/, OLR /t͡ʃɪt͡ʃɪm/, LKN /t͡ʃɪːt͡ʃɪm/, MRL /ⁿdɵⁿdʊ͡ɵm/ > (4) *ⁿdomiⁿdomi > LTG /ʈ͡ʂəmʈ͡ʂo͡əm/, MTP /ⁿdɪmⁿdɪm/	
*ᵑg	*ᵑg	(in onset position of modern syllable) /ᵑg/ in VLW. /k/ in all other daughter languages.	POc *kuRiap "dolphin" > PTB *ᵑg[ur]io; > (1) *ᵑgurio > HIW /kʷg͡ʟɪ/, LTG /kʷuriə/ > (2) *ᵑgio > LHI /n-kɛ/, LYP /n-kɪ/, VLW /nɪ-ᵑgɪ/, MTP /nɪ-kɪ/, VRS /kɪ/, MSN /kɪ/, MTA /kio/, NUM /wi-ki/, KRO /kɪ/, OLR /kɪ/, LKN /kɪ/, MRL /nɛ-kɛ͡a/	
*ᵑg	*ᵑg	(in coda position of modern syllable) /ŋ/ in LYP and VLW /k/ in all other daughter languages.	POc *[i]ko[e] "thou" > PTB *[n]iᵑgo > HIW /ikə/, LTG /nikə/, LHI /nɛk/, LYP /niŋ/, VLW /nɪŋ/, MTP /nɪk/, LMG /næk/, VRA /nikɪ/, VRS /nɪk/, MSN /nɪk/, MTA /niko/, NUM /nik/, DRG /nɪk/, KRO /nɪk/, OLR /nɪk/, LKN /nɪk/, MRL /nɛ͡ak/	
*mʷ	*mʷ (>*ŋ͡mʷ)	> /ŋ͡mʷ/ in most daughter languages. /ŋʷ/ in HIW, LTG, LHI and MRL.	POc *mʷata "snake" > PTB *mʷata > *ŋ͡mʷata > HIW /ŋʷatə/, LTG /ŋʷetə/, LHI /ŋʷat/, LYP /ŋ͡mʷat/, VLW /n-ŋ͡mʷat/, MTP /na-ŋ͡mʷat/, LMG /ŋ͡mʷaʔ/, VRA /ŋ͡mʷaʔa/, VRS /ŋ͡mʷat/, MSN /ŋ͡mʷat/, MTA /ŋ͡mʷata/, NUM /ŋ͡mʷat/, DRG /ŋ͡mʷat/, KRO /ŋ͡mʷa/, LKN /ŋ͡mʷat/, MRL /ŋʷat/	
*m	*m	> /m/ in all daughter languages.	POc *mate "die, dead" > PTB *mate > HIW /met/, LTG /met/, LHI /mat/, LYP /mat/, VLW /mat/, MTP /mat/, LMG /maʔ/, VRA /maʔ/, VRS /mi͡at/, MSN /mat/, MTA /mate/, NUM /mat/, DRG /mat/, KRO /mat/, OLR /mat/, LKN /mæt/, MRL /mɛt/	
*m	*mʷ	*m before a rounded vowel → same reflexes as with *mʷ (often, though not always; mostly in northern languages).	POc *mule "return" > PTB *m[ʷ]ule; > (1) *mule > LMG /mʊl/, VRA /mulʊ/, MTA /mule/, DRG /mʊl/, LKN /mulæ/ > (2) *mʷule > HIW /ŋʷujə/, LTG /ŋʷulə/, LHI /ŋʷɔl/, LYP /ŋ͡mʷʊl/, MTP /ŋ͡mʷʊl/	
*n / *ñ	*n	> /n/ in all daughter languages.	POc *ñatuq "Burckella" > PTB *natu > HIW /nɔt/, MTP /nɛ-nɛt/, VRA /nɛʔ/, VRS /nœt/, MTA /natu/, POc *ñamuk "mosquito" > PTB *namu[ɣi]; > (1) *namu > LTG /ni͡ɛm/, LHI /næm/, LHI /nɛm/, VLW /n-nɛm/, MTP /nɛ-nɛm/, LMG /nœm/, VRA /nam/, VRS /nɛm/, MSN /nɔm/, MTA /nam[u]/, NUM /nam/, MRL /nɞ-nɔm/ > (2) *namuɣi > DRG /ⁿdŋ͡mʷuɣ/, KRO /muɣ/, OLR /muː/, LKN /namuɣ/	
*ŋ	*ŋ	> /ŋ/ in all daughter languages.	POc *qaŋaRi "Canarium" > PTB *[a]ŋa[r]i; > (1) *[a]ŋari > HIW /ŋeg͡ʟ/, LTG /ŋɛr/, LHI /n-ŋæj/, LYP /n-ŋɪj/, VLW /n-ŋɛj/, MTP /na-ŋɛj/, LMG /n-ŋɛr/, VRA /ŋar/, > (2) *[a]ŋai > MTA /ŋai/, NUM /ŋa/, DRG /ŋa/, KRO /ŋa/, OLR /ŋa/, LKN /aŋæ/, MRL /nɪ-ŋɪ/	
*s / *c / *j	*s	Usually /s/ in the daughter languages, but can debuccalize or disappear under uncertain conditions: /s/ or /h/ in LHI, VLW, MTP and LKN /h/ or Ø in LTG /s/ or /t/ or Ø in HIW.	POc *sake "up" > PTB *saɣe > HIW /aɣ/, LTG /[i]aɣ/, LHI /ha/, LYP /sa/, VLW /ha/, MTP /haɣ/, LMG /saɣ/, VRA /saɣ/, VRS /si͡aɣ/, MSN /saɣ/, MTA /saɣe/, NUM /sa/, DRG /saɣ/, KRO /sa[ɣ]/, OLR /saː/, LKN /haɣ/, MRL /sɛ͡aɣ/; POc *sale "to float" > PTB *sale > HIW /aj/, LTG /al/, MTP /hal/, LMG /sal/, MTA /sale/	
*l	*l	> /l/ in all daughter languages except: /j/ in HIW.	POc *lalo-ᵑgu "my inside" > PTB *lolo-ᵑgu "my mind" > HIW /jɵ-k/, LTG /lio-k/, LHI /n-lɪ-k/, LYP /n-lø-k/, VLW /n-lɪ-ŋ/, MTP /na-lɪ-k/, LMG /n-lø-k/, VRA /lʊ-k/, VRS /lølø-k/, MSN /lʊlʊ-k/, MTA /lolo-k/, NUM /na-llɔ-k/, DRG /na-llʊ-k/, KRO /na-llʊ-k/, OLR /lʊlʊ-k/, LKN /lɔlɔ-k/, MRL /lɵ-k/	
*r	*r	Preserved as an alveolar trill /r/ in most daughter languages, except: /g͡ʟ/ in HIW /j/ in LHI, LYP, VLW, MTP /j/ in OLR (in syllable codas); In syllable codas, *r disappears in LKN with compensatory lengthening of a preceding vowel.	POc *roŋoR "to hear" > PTB *roŋo > HIW /g͡ʟoŋ/, LTG /roŋ/, LHI /jɛŋ/, LYP /jɔŋ/, VLW /jɔŋ-tɛɣ/, MTP /jɔŋ-tɛɣ/, LMG /rɔŋ/, VRA /rʊŋ/, VRS /roŋ-tɛɣ/, MSN /rɔŋ-tɛ/, MTA /roŋo/, NUM /rɔŋɔ-tɛ/, DRG /rɔŋ/, KRO /rɔŋ/, OLR /rɔŋ/, LKN /rɔŋ-tæɣ/, MRL /rɔŋ/; POc *paRi "stingray" > PTB *βari > HIW /βɔg͡ʟ/, LTG /βɛr/, LHI /n-βæj/, LYP /n-βɪj/, VLW /n-βɪj/, MTP /nɛ-βɛj/, LMG /n-βɛr/, VRA /fɛr/, VRS /βœr/, MSN /βɛr/, MTA /βar/, NUM /fɛr/, DRG /βaːr/, KRO /βɛ͡ar/, OLR /βaj/, LKN /βæː/, MRL /nɛ-βɛr/	
*R	*r / Ø	In most cases the reflexes are consistent across Torres–Banks languages: either they all lost *R, or all reflect them as *r. However, for about 20 words, the reflexes are inconsistent, with *R preserved in northern languages vs. lost further south; this is evidence that PTB formed a network of separated dialects.	POc *qaŋaRi "Canarium" > PTB *[a]ŋa[r]i; > (1) *[a]ŋari > HIW /ŋeg͡ʟ/, LTG /ŋɛr/, LHI /n-ŋæj/, LYP /n-ŋɪj/, VLW /n-ŋɛj/, MTP /na-ŋɛj/, LMG /n-ŋɛr/, VRA /ŋar/, > (2) *[a]ŋai > MTA /ŋai/, NUM /ŋa/, DRG /ŋa/, KRO /ŋa/, OLR /ŋa/, LKN /aŋæ/, MRL /nɪ-ŋɪ/: POc *kuRiap "dolphin" > PTB *ᵑg[ur]io; > (1) *ᵑgurio > HIW /kʷg͡ʟɪ/, LTG /kʷuriə/ > (2) *ᵑgio > LHI /n-kɛ/, LYP /n-kɪ/, VLW /nɪ-ᵑgɪ/, MTP /nɪ-kɪ/, VRS /kɪ/, MSN /kɪ/, MTA /kio/, NUM /wi-ki/, KRO /kɪ/, OLR /kɪ/, LKN /kɪ/, MRL /nɛ-kɛ͡a/	
*q	Ø (hiatus)	Sequences of identical vowels that resulted after its loss were reduced to a single vowel, as in POc *saqat-i "bad" > PTB *sati.	POc *saqat "bad" > PTB *saa[ti]; > (1) *saa > HIW /ssa/, LTG /hi͡a/, KRO /sa/, OLR /sa/, LKN /sa/ > (2) *sati > LHI /sæt/, LYP /sɛt/, VLW /hɪt/, MTP /hɛt/, LMG /sɛʔ/, VRA /sɛʔ/, MRL /sɪt/ > (3) *tatasi (metathesis) > MTA /tatas/, NUM /ttɪs/, DRG /ttaːs/	
*w	*w	Generally preserved only in the Torres languages and lost in the Banks languages. Sometimes retained between vowels: PNCV *marawa "spider" > PTB *marawa > MTA /marawa/.	POc *waᵑga "canoe" > PTB *waᵑga > HIW /wakə/, LTG /ekə/, LHI /n-ɒk/, LYP /n-ɔŋ/, VLW /n-ɔk/, MTP /n-ɔk/, VRA /naka/, VRS /ak/, MSN /ak/, MTA /aka/, NUM /w-ak/, DRG /ak/, OLR /n-ak/, LKN /n-ak/; POc *ᵐbakewa "shark" > PTB *ᵐbaɣewa; > (1) HIW /poweɣə/ (metathesis), LTG /pəɣɛwə/ > (2) *ᵐbaɣea > LHI /n-pəɣæ/, LYP /n-pɛɣɛ/, VRA /ᵐbɛɣiɛ/, KRO /ᵐbɛɣɛ/, OLR /pɛɣɛ/, LKN /paɣɛ/ > (3) *ᵐbaɣoa > MTP /na-ᵐbaɣɔ/, LMG /pɔɣɔ/, VRS /ᵐboɣo/, MSN /pɔɣɔ/, MTA /paɣoa/, NUM /ᵐbɔɣɔ/, DRG /ᵐbɣɔ/, MRL /na-ᵐbaɣɔ/	
*y	*y	Generally lost in the daughter languages. Cases such as PNCV *maraya "eel" > PTB *maraya, where reflexes such as MTA /marea/ and LKN /marɛ/ presuppose *marea, but MTP /na-mja/ presupposes *maraa, can be taken as evidence that PTB had not yet lost the phoneme.	POc *kawaR "potent root" > *kawa > *kaya (irregular change) > PTB *ɣaya > HIW /ɣa/, LTG /ɣi/, LYP /n-ɣa/, VLW /na-ɣa/, MTP /na-ɣa/, LMG /n-ɣa/, VRA /ɣiɛ/, VRS /ɣɪ/, MSN /ɣɛ/, MTA /ɣea/, NUM /ɣɛ/, DRG /ɣɛ/, KRO /ɣɛ/, OLR /ɣɛ/, LKN /ɣɛ/	

== Grammar ==
=== Pronouns ===
The pronouns of Proto-Torres–Banks are (from François 2016: 33-35):

		Singular	Dual	Trial	Plural
1st person	exclusive	*nau	*[ɣ,ᵑg]amarua	*[ɣ,ᵑg]amatolu	*[ɣ,ᵑg]ama[m]i
1st person	inclusive	*nau	*ɣiⁿdarua	*ɣiⁿdatolu	*ɣiⁿda
2nd person		*[n]iᵑgo	*[ɣ,ᵑg]amurua	*[ɣ,ᵑg]amutolu	*[ɣ,ᵑg]amuyu
3rd person		*nia	*[i]rarua	*[i]ratolu	*[ɣ,ᵑg]ira

=== Numbers ===
The following are reconstructions for numbers 1–10 for PTB:

1. *tea, *tuwale
2. *rua
3. *tolu
4. *βati
5. *taβea-lima
6. *laβea-tea
7. *laβea-rua
8. *laβea-tolu
9. *laβea-βati
10. *saŋaβulu

=== Example sentence ===
A reconstructed sentence (from François 2009:191):

*Nau ᵑgu= mule ᵑgu= maturu.
1SG AO:1SG= return AO:1SG= sleep
'So I went back and slept.'/'Let me go back and sleep!'
