= Tapu (Polynesian culture) =

Polynesian traditional concept denoting something holy or sacred

Tapu is a Polynesian traditional concept denoting something holy or sacred, with "spiritual restriction" or "implied prohibition"; it involves rules and prohibitions. The English word taboo derives from the latter meaning and dates from Captain James Cook's visit to Tonga in 1777.

The concept exists in many Polynesian societies, including traditional Māori, Samoan, Kiribati, Rapanui, Tahitian, Hawaiian, and Tongan cultures, in most cases using a recognisably similar word (from Proto-Polynesian *tapu). In Hawaii, a similar concept is known as kapu; /t/ and /k/ are standard allophonic variations in Hawaiian phonology.

== Outside Polynesian ==
The root also exists outside Polynesian languages, in the broader Austronesian family: e.g. Fijian tabu, Hiw (Vanuatu) toq [tɔkʷ] 'holy, sacred', Mwotlap ne-teq [nɛ-tɛk͡pʷ] 'cemetery', and others.

Whether Polynesian or not, all modern forms go back to a Proto-Oceanic etymon reconstructed as *tabu [taᵐbu], and whose meaning was “forbidden, off limits; sacred, due to a sentiment of awe before spiritual forces”.

As for cognates outside Oceanic, they seem to be confined to the Central-Eastern Malayo-Polynesian group, with a form reconstructable as *tambu.

== In Polynesian languages ==
=== In Māori tradition ===
In Māori and Tongan traditions, something that is tapu is considered inviolable or sacrosanct. Things or places which are tapu must be left alone, and may not be approached or interfered with. In some cases, they should not even be spoken of.

In Māori society the concept was often used by tohunga (priests) to protect resources from over-exploitation, by declaring a fishery or other resource as tapu (see rāhui).

There are two kinds of tapu, the private (relating to individuals) and the public tapu (relating to communities). A person, object, or place that is tapu, may not be touched by human contact, in some cases, not even approached. A person, object, or place could be made sacred by tapu for a certain time.

Before European contact, tapu was one of the strongest forces in Māori life. A violation of tapu could have dire consequences, including the death of the offender through sickness or at the hands of someone affected by the offence. In earlier times food cooked for a person of high rank was tapu, and could not be eaten by an inferior. A chief's house was tapu, and even the chief could not eat food in the interior of his house. Not only were the houses of people of high rank perceived to be tapu, but also their possessions including their clothing. Burial grounds and places of death were always tapu, and these areas were often surrounded by a protective fence. Historically, anyone ill or dying, or mothers about to give birth, will be transferred to shelters separate from the house (whare).

In at least one case, a chief declared a whole settlement – Auckland, a newly-founded European settler town – as tapu, to clarify to other tribes that he considered it as under his protection.

Today, tapu is still observed in matters relating to sickness, death, and burial:

- Tangihanga or funeral rites can take up to five days. The deceased lies in state, usually in an open coffin flanked by female relatives dressed in black, their heads sometimes wreathed in kawakawa leaves, who take few and short breaks. During the day, visitors come, sometimes from great distances despite only a distant relationship, to address the deceased. They may speak frankly of the deceased's faults as well as virtues, but singing and joking are also appropriate. Free expression of grief by both men and women is encouraged. Traditional beliefs may be invoked, and the deceased told to return to the ancestral homeland, Hawaiki, by way of te rerenga wairua, the spirits' journey. The close kin known as kiri mate ("dead skin") may not speak. On the last night, the pō whakamutunga (night of ending), the mourners hold a vigil and at sunrise the coffin is closed, before a church or marae funeral service and/or graveside interment ceremony, invariably Christian. It is traditional for mourners to wash their hands in water and sprinkle some on their heads before leaving a cemetery. After the burial rites are completed, a feast is traditionally served. Mourners are expected to provide koha or gifts towards the meal. After the burial, the home of the deceased and the place they died are ritually cleansed with karakia (prayers or incantations) and desanctified with food and drink, in a ceremony called takahi whare, trampling the house. That night, the pō whakangahau (night of entertainment) is a night of relaxation and rest. The widow or widower is not left alone for several nights following.
- During the following year, the kinfolk of a prominent deceased person will visit other marae, "bringing the death" (kawe mate) to them. They carry pictures of the person on to the marae.
- Unveilings of headstones (hura kōwhatu) are usually held about a year after a death, often on a public holiday to accommodate visitors who could not get to the tangihanga. The dead are remembered and more grief expressed.
- A Rangatira (chief) or Toa (warrior), while having his Tā moko (facial tattoo) done, is considered Tapu while the tattooist is carving it, and not allowed to feed himself or touch or even look at his own reflection.
- Manuhiri/manuwhiri guests or visitors at a Marae are considered tapu until food has touched or passed through their mouths.

Tapu is also still observed at the site of whale strandings. Whales are regarded as spiritual treasures as being descendants of the ocean god, Tangaroa, and are as such held in very high respect. Sites of whale strandings and any whale carcasses from strandings are treated as sacred ground.

=== Noa ===
Noa, on the other hand, lifts the tapu from the person or the object. Noa is similar to a blessing. Tapu and noa remain part of Māori culture today, although persons today are not subject to the same tapu as that of previous times. A new house today, for example, may have a noa ceremony to remove the tapu, in order to make the home safe before the family moves in.

== Notes and references ==
=== References ===
- Cook, James; King, James (1821). A voyage to the Pacific Ocean: undertaken by command of His Majesty, for making discoveries in the Northern Hemisphere : performed under the direction of Captains Cook, Clerke, and Gore : in the years 1776, 1777, 1778, 1779, and 1780 : being a copious, comprehensive, and satisfactory abridgement of the voyage. Printed for Champante and Whitrow ... and M. Watson; 1793.
- François, Alexandre (2022). "Awesome forces and warning signs: Charting the semantic history of *tabu words in Vanuatu" (PDF). Oceanic Linguistics. 61 (1): 212–255. doi:10.1353/ol.2022.0017. ISSN 1527-9421. S2CID 240387414.
