= Lehali language =

Austronesian language spoken in Vanuatu

Lehali
- Loli
- Pronunciation: [lɔli]
- Native to: Vanuatu
- Region: Ureparapara
- Native speakers: 200 (2010)
- Language family: Austronesian: Malayo-Polynesian; Oceanic; Southern Oceanic; North-Central Vanuatu; North Vanuatu; Torres-Banks; Lehali

Language codes
- ISO 639-3: tql
- Glottolog: leha1243
- ELP: Lehali
- Lehali is classified as Vulnerable by the UNESCO Atlas of the World's Languages in Danger.

A speaker of Lehali, recorded in Vanuatu

Lehali (previously known as Teqel) is an Oceanic language spoken by about 200 people, on the west coast of Ureparapara Island in Vanuatu. It is distinct from Löyöp, the language spoken on the east coast of the same island.

== Name ==
The language is named after the village where it is spoken, natively referred to as Loli [lɔli].

== Phonology ==
Lehali phonemically contrasts 16 consonants and 10 vowels.

=== Consonants ===
Lehali consonants
| | | Bilabial | Alveolar | Dorsal | Labialized velar | Glottal |
|---|---|---|---|---|---|---|
| Nasal | | m ⟨m⟩ | n ⟨n⟩ | ŋ ⟨n̄⟩ | ŋʷ ⟨n̄w⟩ | |
| Stop | voiceless | p ⟨p⟩ | t ⟨t⟩ | k ⟨k⟩ | kʷ ⟨q⟩ | |
| Stop | prenasalized | | ⁿd ⟨d⟩ | | | |
| Fricative | | β ⟨v⟩ | s ⟨s⟩ | ɣ ⟨g⟩ | | h ⟨h⟩ |
| Approximant | | | l ⟨l⟩ | j ⟨y⟩ | w ⟨w⟩ | |

=== Vowels ===
The 10 vowel phonemes are all short monophthongs /i ɪ ɛ æ ə a ɒ̝ ɔ ʊ u/:

Lehali vowels
| | Front | Central | Back |
|---|---|---|---|
| Close | i ⟨i⟩ | | u ⟨u⟩ |
| Near-close | ɪ ⟨ē⟩ | ə ⟨ë⟩ | ʊ ⟨ō⟩ |
| Open-mid | ɛ ⟨e⟩ | ə ⟨ë⟩ | ɔ ⟨o⟩ |
| Near-open | æ ⟨ä⟩ | | ɒ̝ ⟨ö⟩ |
| Open | a ⟨a⟩ | | |

=== Historical phonology ===
The ⟨y⟩ /j/ phoneme originates in a former trill *r: e.g. /-jɔ/ < POc *rua 'two'. Lehali shares that particular sound change with its neighbors Löyöp, Volow, and Mwotlap.

== Grammar ==
The system of personal pronouns in Lehali contrasts clusivity, and distinguishes four numbers (singular, dual, trial, plural).

Most negative morphemes are discontinuous, wrapped around the predicate phrase: e.g. /tɛt nɛ … tæ/ (Negative realis ‘did/does not’), /tɛt … kʷɔ/ (Nondumitive ‘not yet’), /tɛt … vɪstæ/ (Negative potential ‘cannot’). Historically, this pattern reflects an instance of Jespersen's cycle.

Spatial reference in Lehali is based on a system of geocentric (absolute) directionals, which is in part typical of Oceanic languages, and yet innovative.

== Bibliography ==
- François, Alexandre (2011). "Social ecology and language history in the northern Vanuatu linkage: A tale of divergence and convergence" (PDF). Journal of Historical Linguistics. 1 (2): 175–246. doi:10.1075/jhl.1.2.03fra. hdl:1885/29283. S2CID 42217419.
- —— (2012). "The dynamics of linguistic diversity: Egalitarian multilingualism and power imbalance among northern Vanuatu languages" (PDF). International Journal of the Sociology of Language (214): 85–110. doi:10.1515/ijsl-2012-0022. S2CID 145208588.
- —— (2015). "The ins and outs of up and down: Disentangling the nine geocentric space systems of Torres and Banks languages" (PDF). In François, Alexandre; Lacrampe, Sébastien; Franjieh, Michael; Schnell, Stefan (eds.). The languages of Vanuatu: Unity and diversity. Studies in the Languages of Island Melanesia. Canberra: Asia-Pacific Linguistics. pp. 137–195. hdl:1885/14819. ISBN 978-1-922185-23-5.
- —— (2016). "The historical morphology of personal pronouns in northern Vanuatu" (PDF). In Pozdniakov, Konstantin (ed.). Comparatisme et reconstruction : tendances actuelles. Faits de Langues. Vol. 47. Bern: Peter Lang. pp. 25–60.
- —— (2021). "Presentation of the Lehali language and audio archive". Pangloss Collection. Paris: CNRS.
- —— (2026). "Negation in Dorig" (PDF). In Miestamo, Matti; Veselinova, Ljuba (eds.). Negation in the World's Languages. Research on Comparative Grammar 9. Vol. 3. Berlin: Language Science Press. pp. 73–128. doi:10.5281/zenodo.18234067. ISBN 978-3-96110-554-0.
