= Koro–Olrat language =

Koro–Olrat is a Glottolog classification that includes the following two languages of Gaua Island, Vanuatu:

- Koro language (Vanuatu), an Oceanic language spoken on Gaua island
- Olrat language, a moribund Oceanic language spoken on Gaua island
