= Alexandre François =

French linguist

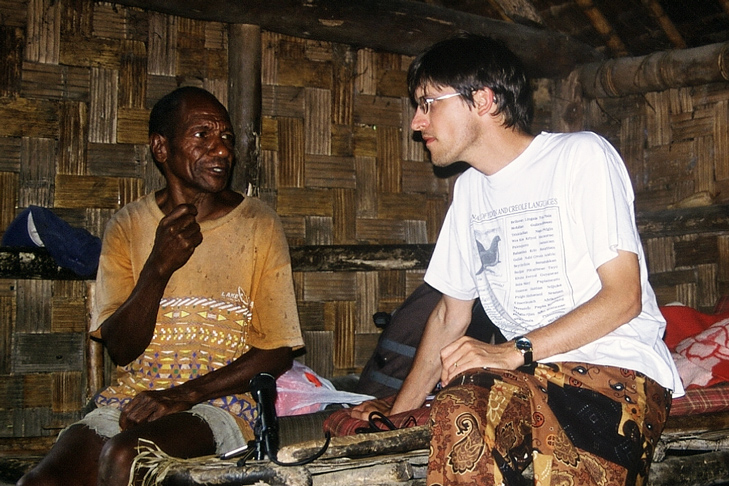
- Alexandre François (right) meeting with Maten Womal, the last storyteller in the Olrat language (Gaua, Vanuatu, 2003)
- Born: March 28, 1972 (age 54)
- Occupation: Linguist

Academic work
- Institutions: CNRS
- Main interests: Oceanic languages
- Notable ideas: Colexification

Alexandre François is a French linguist specialising in the description and study of the indigenous languages of Melanesia. He belongs to Lattice, a research centre of the CNRS and École Normale Supérieure dedicated to linguistics.

== Research ==
=== Language description and documentation ===
François has done linguistic fieldwork in Vanuatu and the Solomon Islands.

In 2002, he published a grammatical description of Araki, a language spoken by a handful of speakers on an islet south of Espiritu Santo (Vanuatu).

Most of his research focuses on the northern islands of Vanuatu, known as the Torres and Banks Islands, an area where sixteen out of seventeen languages are still spoken: Hiw, Lo-Toga, Lehali, Löyöp, Mwotlap, Volow (extinct), Lemerig, Vera'a, Vurës, Mwesen, Mota, Nume, Dorig, Koro, Olrat, Lakon, Mwerlap - all descended from the Proto-Torres–Banks language, which was also reconstructed by him. After describing Mwotlap, the language with most speakers in that area, he has published articles comparing the languages of the area more generally – both from a synchronic and historical perspectives. He has described the sociolinguistic profile of this area as one of "egalitarian multilingualism".

In 2005, François took part in a scientific expedition to Vanikoro (Solomon Islands), whose objective was to understand the wreckage of the French navigator La Pérouse in 1788. As a member of a multidisciplinary team, he recorded the oral tradition of the Melanesian and Polynesian populations of this island, concerning popular representations of this historical event. On that occasion, he also documented the three languages spoken on Vanikoro – Teanu, Lovono and Tanema – two of which are highly endangered.

In 2015, he coauthored with Jean-Michel Charpentier the Linguistic Atlas of French Polynesia, an atlas showcasing the internal linguistic diversity of French Polynesia.

In 2020, he was elected a member of the Academia Europaea.

=== Documentation of languages and cultures in Melanesia ===
François recorded texts from the oral literature – myths, legends, folktales – in various language communities of Vanuatu and the Solomons.

He provided local communities with various books in their languages, in the perspective of promoting the use of vernacular languages in writing.

Together with ethnomusicologist Monika Stern and anthropologist Éric Wittersheim, he ran a multidisciplinary project on traditional music and poetry in Vanuatu. This led to the publication of Music of Vanuatu: Celebrations and Mysteries, a CD album of songs and dances recorded during social events in the field.

=== Contribution to linguistic typology and theory ===
François coined the term "colexification". This term, used in lexical typology, captures the fact that certain concepts, which some languages distinguish in their lexicons, are encoded in the same way ("colexified") in other languages.

Together with Siva Kalyan (ANU), he also developed historical glottometry, a non-cladistic approach to language genealogy, inspired by the wave model.

== See also ==
- Meillet's principle
