= Mwesen language =

Austronesian language spoken in Vanuatu

Mwesen
- Mosina
- M̄ēsēn
- Pronunciation: [ŋ͡mʷɪˈsɪn]
- Native to: Vanuatu
- Region: Vanua Lava
- Native speakers: 10 (2012)
- Language family: Austronesian: Malayo-Polynesian; Oceanic; Southern Oceanic; North-Central Vanuatu; North Vanuatu; Torres-Banks; Mwesen

Language codes
- ISO 639-3: msn (shared with Vurës)
- Glottolog: vure1239 Vurës
- ELP: Mwesen
- Mwesen is classified as Critically Endangered by the UNESCO Atlas of the World's Languages in Danger.

Mwesen (formerly known by its Mota name Mosina) is an Oceanic language spoken in the southeastern area of Vanua Lava Island, in the Banks Islands of northern Vanuatu, by about 10 speakers.

Mwesen shows many similarities with the island's dominant language Vurës, to such an extent that they have sometimes been considered dialects of a single language. However, studies have shown that Mwesen and Vurës have various dissimilarities, e.g. in their vowel systems, in their noun articles, in their pronoun paradigms.

== Name ==
The name Mwesen is originally the name of a village, in the eastern part of Vanua Lava; it is spelled M̄ēsēn [ŋ͡mʷɪˈsɪn] both in Mwesen itself, and in neighbouring Vurës. The village is known as Am̄sēn [aŋ͡mʷˈsɪn] (with locative prefix a-) in Mwotlap, and as M̄osina [ŋ͡mʷosina] (modern: M̄osna [ŋ͡mʷosna]) in Mota. All these different names are derived from a Proto-Torres-Banks form *mʷosina.

The old Mota name M̄osina was the source of Mosina, one of the names which was occasionally given, in English, to the Mwesen language (sometimes encompassing Mwesen together with Vurës).

== Phonology ==
Mwesen has 7 phonemic vowels. These are all short monophthongs /i ɪ ɛ a ɔ ʊ u/:

Mwesen vowels
	Front	Back
Close	i ⟨i⟩	u ⟨u⟩
Near-close	ɪ ⟨ē⟩	ʊ ⟨ō⟩
Open-mid	ɛ ⟨e⟩	ɔ ⟨o⟩
Open	a ⟨a⟩	

== Grammar ==
The system of personal pronouns in Mwesen contrasts clusivity, and distinguishes four numbers (singular, dual, trial, plural).

Spatial reference in Mwesen is based on a system of geocentric (absolute) directionals, which is in part typical of Oceanic languages, in part innovative.

== Bibliography ==
- François, Alexandre (2005), "Unraveling the history of the vowels of seventeen northern Vanuatu languages" (PDF), Oceanic Linguistics, 44 (2): 443–504, doi:10.1353/ol.2005.0034, S2CID 131668754
- —— (2007), "Noun articles in Torres and Banks languages: Conservation and innovation" (PDF), in Siegel, Jeff; Lynch, John; Eades, Diana (eds.), Language Description, History and Development: Linguistic indulgence in memory of Terry Crowley, Creole Language Library 30, Amsterdam: Benjamins, pp. 313–326, doi:10.1075/cll.30.30fra
- —— (2009), "Verbal aspect and personal pronouns: The history of aorist markers in north Vanuatu" (PDF), in Pawley, Andrew; Adelaar, Alexander (eds.), Austronesian historical linguistics and culture history: A festschrift for Bob Blust, vol. 601, Canberra: Pacific Linguistics, pp. 179–195
- —— (2011), "Social ecology and language history in the northern Vanuatu linkage: A tale of divergence and convergence" (PDF), Journal of Historical Linguistics, 1 (2): 175–246, doi:10.1075/jhl.1.2.03fra, hdl:1885/29283, S2CID 42217419.
- —— (2012), "The dynamics of linguistic diversity: Egalitarian multilingualism and power imbalance among northern Vanuatu languages" (PDF), International Journal of the Sociology of Language, 2012 (214): 85–110, doi:10.1515/ijsl-2012-0022, S2CID 145208588
- —— (2015). "The ins and outs of up and down: Disentangling the nine geocentric space systems of Torres and Banks languages" (PDF). In Alexandre François; Sébastien Lacrampe; Michael Franjieh; Stefan Schnell (eds.). The languages of Vanuatu: Unity and diversity. Studies in the Languages of Island Melanesia. Canberra: Asia-Pacific Linguistics. pp. 137–195. ISBN 978-1-922185-23-5.
- —— (2016), "The historical morphology of personal pronouns in northern Vanuatu" (PDF), in Pozdniakov, Konstantin (ed.), Comparatisme et reconstruction : tendances actuelles, Faits de Langues, vol. 47, Bern: Peter Lang, pp. 25–60
- —— (2025). "Presentation of the Mwesen language and audio archive". Pangloss Collection. Paris: CNRS.
