= Valuwa =

Valuwa is sometimes used as an alternative name for:

- Aplow, a village and associated district of Vanuatu
- Volow, an extinct communalect previously spoken in the same area.
- the small airstrip of Motalava island, also known as Valua or Valuwa airport, located close to the village of Aplow.
