= Olrat language =

Austronesian language spoken in Vanuatu

Olrat
- Ōlrat
- Pronunciation: [ʊlrat]
- Native to: Vanuatu
- Region: Gaua
- Extinct: 2009, with the death of Maten Womal
- Language family: Austronesian: Malayo-Polynesian; Oceanic; Southern Oceanic; North-Central Vanuatu; North Vanuatu; Torres-Banks; Olrat

Language codes
- ISO 639-3: olr
- Glottolog: olra1234
- ELP: Olrat
- Olrat was classified as Critically Endangered by the Atlas of the World's Languages in Danger (2010), but more recent sources reveal it is now extinct.

Olrat is an extinct Oceanic language of Gaua island, in northern Vanuatu. It became extinct in 2009 with the death of its last speaker, Maten Womal.

== Name ==
The name Olrat (spelled natively as Ōlrat [ʊlrat]) is an endonym. Robert Codrington mentions a place south of Lakon village under the Mota name Ulrata. A few decades later, Sidney Ray mentions the language briefly in 1926 under the name Ulrata ‒ but provides no linguistic information.

== Speakers ==
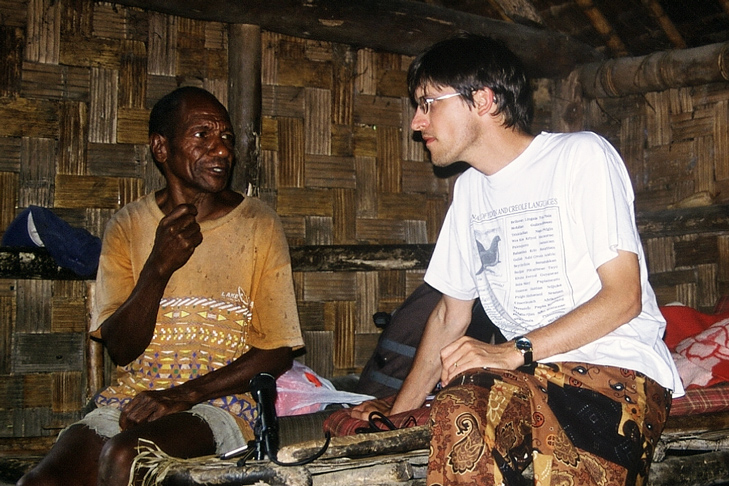
A. François with †Maten Womal, the last storyteller of Olrat (Gaua, Vanuatu, 2003)

In 2003, only three speakers of Olrat remained, who lived on the middle-west coast of Gaua. Their community had left their inland hamlet of Olrat in the first half of the 20th century, and merged into the larger village of Jōlap where Lakon is dominant.

Alexandre François identifies Olrat as a distinct language from its immediate neighbor Lakon, on phonological, grammatical, and lexical grounds.

== Phonology ==
Olrat has 14 phonemic vowels. These include 7 short /i ɪ ɛ a ɔ ʊ u/ and 7 long vowels /iː ɪː ɛː aː ɔː ʊː uː/.

Olrat vowels
	Front	Back
Near-close	i ⟨i⟩ ∙ iː ⟨ii⟩	u ⟨u⟩ ∙ uː ⟨uu⟩
Close-mid	ɪ ⟨ē⟩ ∙ ɪː ⟨ēē⟩	ʊ ⟨ō⟩ ∙ ʊː ⟨ōō⟩
Open-mid	ɛ ⟨e⟩ ∙ ɛː ⟨ee⟩	ɔ ⟨o⟩ ∙ ɔː ⟨oo⟩
Open	a ⟨a⟩ ∙ aː ⟨aa⟩	

Historically, the phonologization of vowel length originates in the compensatory lengthening of short vowels when the voiced velar fricative /ɣ/ was lost syllable-finally.

== Grammar ==
The system of personal pronouns in Olrat contrasts clusivity, and distinguishes four numbers (singular, dual, trial, plural).

Spatial reference in Olrat is based on a system of geocentric (absolute) directionals, which is typical of Oceanic languages.

== Notes and references ==
=== Bibliography ===
- François, Alexandre (2005), "Unraveling the history of the vowels of seventeen northern Vanuatu languages" (PDF), Oceanic Linguistics, 44 (2): 443–504, doi:10.1353/ol.2005.0034, S2CID 131668754
- —— (2007), "Noun articles in Torres and Banks languages: Conservation and innovation" (PDF), in Siegel, Jeff; Lynch, John; Eades, Diana (eds.), Language Description, History and Development: Linguistic indulgence in memory of Terry Crowley, Creole Language Library 30, Amsterdam: Benjamins, pp. 313–326
- —— (2011), "Social ecology and language history in the northern Vanuatu linkage: A tale of divergence and convergence" (PDF), Journal of Historical Linguistics, 1 (2): 175–246, doi:10.1075/jhl.1.2.03fra, hdl:1885/29283, S2CID 42217419.
- —— (2012), "The dynamics of linguistic diversity: Egalitarian multilingualism and power imbalance among northern Vanuatu languages" (PDF), International Journal of the Sociology of Language (214): 85–110, doi:10.1515/ijsl-2012-0022, S2CID 145208588
- —— (2015). "The ins and outs of up and down: Disentangling the nine geocentric space systems of Torres and Banks languages" (PDF). In Alexandre François; Sébastien Lacrampe; Michael Franjieh; Stefan Schnell (eds.). The languages of Vanuatu: Unity and diversity. Studies in the Languages of Island Melanesia. Canberra: Asia-Pacific Linguistics. pp. 137–195. hdl:1885/14819. ISBN 978-1-922185-23-5.
- —— (2016), "The historical morphology of personal pronouns in northern Vanuatu" (PDF), in Pozdniakov, Konstantin (ed.), Comparatisme et reconstruction : tendances actuelles, Faits de Langues, vol. 47, Bern: Peter Lang, pp. 25–60
- —— (2022). "Presentation of the Olrat language and audio archive". Pangloss Collection. Paris: CNRS.
