= Veraʼa language =

Austronesian language spoken in Vanuatu

Veraʼa
- Vatrata
- Pronunciation: [fɛraʔa]
- Native to: Vanuatu
- Region: Vanua Lava
- Native speakers: 500 (2020)
- Language family: Austronesian: Malayo-Polynesian; Oceanic; Southern Oceanic; North-Central Vanuatu; North Vanuatu; Torres-Banks; Veraʼa

Language codes
- ISO 639-3: vra
- Glottolog: vera1241
- ELP: Vera'a
- Veraʼa is classified as Definitely Endangered by the UNESCO Atlas of the World's Languages in Danger.

Veraʼa, also known as Vatrata, is an Oceanic language spoken on the western coast of Vanua Lava Island, in the Banks Islands of northern Vanuatu.

Veraʼa was described in 2011 by linguist Stefan Schnell.

== Name ==
The language Veraʼa is named after the village where it is spoken. This village is known locally as Veraʼa [fɛraʔa]. The alternate form Vatrata [βatrata], from Mota, is occasionally used. Other cognates include Vurës and Mwesen Vetrat [βɛtˈrat], and Lemerig Vera’ [βɛˈraʔ]. These names ultimately reflect a protoform *βaturata in Proto-Torres–Banks—literally "flat stone": *βatu "stone" (< POc *patu) + *rata "flat" (< POc *rataR < PAN *dataR).

== Recent history ==
According to recently recorded oral local history, Vanua Lava was struck by a major earthquake and landslide in 1945 that devastated gardens and hamlets on its north-west coast, as a result of which the Veraʼa community abandoned its previous settlements and resettled to its current main center of residence, the village of Veraʼa (Vatrata). Veraʼa is located about 4 km from the village of Vetuboso, the largest settlement on Vanua Lava that is inhabited mainly by speakers of the closely related language Vurës.

Together with speakers of Veraʼa, speakers of the now moribund language Lemerig moved to the village of Veraʼa. Lemerig is remembered by many residents of Veraʼa, but is no longer used in everyday communication. It is likely that the now de facto loss of the Lemerig language is the result of natural disaster and subsequent resettlement movements.

== Phonology ==
Veraʼa has 7 phonemic vowels, which are all short monophthongs:

	Front	Back
Close	i ⟨i⟩	u ⟨u⟩
Near-close	ɪ ⟨ē⟩	ʊ ⟨ō⟩
Open-mid	ɛ ⟨e⟩	ɔ ⟨o⟩
Open	a ⟨a⟩	

There is no stress in Veraʼa, although the effects of metaphony and vowel reduction must have preceded its loss.

Veraʼa is unique within the local languages of Vanua Lava in that a Proto-Torres–Banks final vowel is retained as an echo vowel (either a, ē, or ō) if it is lower than the preceding vowel, or both the final and preceding vowels are *a. Examples include *βula "moon" > vulō [fulʊ] and *βanua "island" > vunuō [funuʊ]. However, they can be syncopated phrase-medially, as in *βanua laβa "Vanua Lava" > Vunulava [funulafa].

Veraʼa consonants
		Labial	Alveolar	Velar	Labiovelar	Glottal
Nasal		m ⟨m⟩	n ⟨n⟩	ŋ ⟨n̄⟩	ŋ͡m ⟨m̄⟩	
Plosive	voiceless		t ⟨t⟩	k ~ kʰ ⟨k⟩	k͡p ⟨q⟩	ʔ ⟨ʼ⟩
Plosive	prenasal	ᵐb ⟨b⟩	ⁿd ⟨d⟩			
Fricative		f ~ v ⟨v⟩	s ⟨s⟩	x ~ ɣ ⟨g⟩		
Vibrant			ɾ ~ r ⟨r⟩			
Approximant			l ⟨l⟩		w ⟨w⟩	

== Possession ==
In Veraʼa there are two types of possessive constructions recorded, that of direct possessive constructions and indirect possessive constructions. Similar to other Oceanic languages, the distinctions between directly and indirectly possessed nouns in Veraʼa appear to generally correspond to the semantic distinctions seen between inalienable and alienable possession.

In both direct and indirect possessive constructions there are a further three construction sub-types based on the expression of the possessor. The three types of possessor constructions are as follows:

1. possessor as a pronoun expressed by a possessive suffix
2. possessor as a personal NP
3. possessor as a common noun

In order to express the possessor as a pronoun, possessive suffixes are used. Stefan Schnell reports that they "are considered pronominal in nature because they have specific, definite referents and inflect for the same categories as personal pronouns."

Possessive suffixes in Veraʼa
		Singular	Dual	Trial	Plural
1st person	exclusive	-k	-madu(ō)	-mamʼōl	-mam
1st person	inclusive	-k	-du(ō)		-de
2nd person		-m	-mru(ō)	-mʼōl	-mi
3rd person		-gi	-ru(ō)	-rʼōl	-re

=== Direct Possession ===
In Veraʼa, direct possession primarily expresses inalienable or inherently given relationships.

These types of relationships can be seen through expression of:

- kinship relations
- body parts
- other types of part/whole relations (often parts of plants)
- certain concepts that only occur in association with another concept (name of an entity)
- spatial relations (incl. temporal relations expressed in analogy to spatial relations)

==== Direct Possessive Construction ====
Direct possessive constructions consist of the possessum, that of which is being possessed, and the possessor. This structure tends to follow a possessum-possessor order. The possessum is expressed as a bound noun while the possessor can be expressed as either:

1. a pronoun (expressed by a possessive suffix)
2. a personal NP linked to the possessum by the linking suffix -n
3. as a common noun adjacently following the possessum noun

The bound noun possessum will take one of these three possessor constructions as shown below:

(1) Direct possessive construction with a pronominal possessor

n gunu-m
ART spouse-2SG
'your wife / husband'

n kolo-k
ART back-1SG
'my back'

(2) Direct possessive construction with a personal NP possessor

n vono-n e Qo’
ART home-LK ART person.name
'Qo's home'

e gunu-n e Noleen
ART spouse-LK ART person.name
'Noleen's husband'

(3) Direct possessive construction with a common NP possessor

ēn neln̄o- ’an̄sara
ART voice- person
'voice of a person, i.e. a human voice'

ēn deln̄o- ’ama’
ART ear- devil
'ears of a devil / devil ears'

In summary the constructions can be described as follows:

Direct Possessive Constructions
Possessor type	Structure
(1) Pronoun	[possessum NP-possessive suffix]
(2) Personal NP	[possessum NP-n] + [personal NP]
(3) Common NP	[possessum NP] + [common NP]

=== Indirect possession ===
Indirect possessive constructions primarily express alienable possession, that is a possession that is more easily terminated. The possessor is not directly expressed on the possessum noun, rather the possessor is expressed on a possessive classifier. This construction results in the possessum and the possessor being less morphologically dependent on one another. Consequently, this construction allows for the possessor to appear in different positions syntactically and for the possessor to be able to form a standalone NP with the possessum NP being omitted from speech.

Indirect possessive constructions are divided further into two types, labelled Indirect Possessive Construction Type 1 and Type 2 respectively. In addition to both types, indirect possessive constructions also have several different functions, those being the anaphoric/generic use of a classifier (elided NP), the adnominal recipient construction and recipient / beneficiary construction. The different functions of indirect possessive constructions are further explained in Stefan Schnell's A Grammar of Veraʼa: an Oceanic language of North Vanuatu, chapter 6.

==== Indirect Possessive Construction ====
In an indirect possessive construction, the possessum is a free noun and the possessor is hosted by a possessive classifier which mediates the syntactic relation between the possessed and possessor. There are eight possessive classifiers that each express their own respective function and the types of relations that indirect possessive constructions express.

Possessive Classifiers
Possessive Classifier	Function
go-	's.th. to eat'
mo-	's.th. to drink'
ko-	's.th. to use as vessel'
m̄o-	's.th. use as house'
bolo-	's.th. of customary value'
nō-	's.th. personally owned'
qo-	's.th. used to sleep, rest'
mu-	's.th. owned' / other

===== Indirect Possessive Construction Type 1 =====
In the Indirect Possessive Construction Type 1, the possessive classifier is expressed as a bound morpheme with the possessor being expressed as either:

1. a possessive suffix attached to the classifier
2. a personal NP linked to the possessive classifier with the -n suffix
3. as a common noun adjacently following the possessive classifier.

The possessive classifier will take one of these three possessor constructions as shown below:

(1) Indirect possessive construction Type 1 with a pronominal possessor

n qeʼan go-ruō
ART ground POSS.CLF-3D
'their (two) ground to eat from'

n nak ko-k
ART canoe POSS.CLF-1SG
'my canoe (to use as a vessel)'

(2) Indirect possessive construction Type 1 with a personal NP possessor

n nak mu-n e Qo’
ART canoe POSS>CLF-LK ART person.name
'Qo’ 's canoe'

ēn gie mo-n e ’uvusm̄ēl
ART kava POSS.CLF-LK ART high.chief
'the kava of the high chief (to drink)'

(3) Indirect possessive construction Type 1 with a common NP possessor

n gie mo ’uvusm̄ēl
ART kava POSS.CLF high.chief
'the kava of a high chief (to drink)'

n laklak mu ’ama’
ART dance POSS.CLF devil
'a dance of ghosts / a ghost dance'

In summary the constructions are as follows:

Indirect Possessive Construction (Type 1)
Possessor type	Structure
(1) Pronoun	[possessum NP] + [possessive classifier-possessive suffix]
(2) Personal NP	[possessum NP] + [possessive classifier-n] + [personal NP]
(3) Common NP	[possessum NP] + [possessive classifier] + [common NP]

===== Indirect Possessive Construction Type 2 =====
In an Indirect Possessive Construction of Type 2, the possessive classifier precedes the possessed noun. The result of this, is that the possessive classifier and the possessum form a complex NP. The possessor is exclusively expressed by a pronominal possessive suffix.

Indirect Possessive Construction Type 2

maranaga go-dē =n kēl- bigbig rōwē
chief POSS.CLF-1PL.INCL =ART bog- 'meat' down.at.the.sea
'Chief, a big 'meat' for us (to eat) is down at the sea.'

In summary the construction is as follows:

Indirect Possessive Construction (Type 2)
Possessor type	Structure
(1) Pronoun	[possessive classifier-possessive suffix] + [possessum NP]

== Bibliography ==
=== Main reference ===
- Schnell, Stefan (2011). A grammar of Veraʼa. Kiel: Kiel University.

=== Other references ===
- François, Alexandre (2005), "Unraveling the history of the vowels of seventeen northern Vanuatu languages" (PDF), Oceanic Linguistics, 44 (2): 443–504, doi:10.1353/ol.2005.0034, S2CID 131668754
- François, Alexandre (2011), "Social ecology and language history in the northern Vanuatu linkage: A tale of divergence and convergence" (PDF), Journal of Historical Linguistics, 1 (2): 175–246, doi:10.1075/jhl.1.2.03fra, hdl:1885/29283
- François, Alexandre (2012), "The dynamics of linguistic diversity: Egalitarian multilingualism and power imbalance among northern Vanuatu languages" (PDF), International Journal of the Sociology of Language, 2012 (214): 85–110, doi:10.1515/ijsl-2012-0022, S2CID 145208588
- Schnell, Stefan (2012), "Referential Hierarchies in Three-Participant Constructions in Veraʼa", Linguistic Discovery, 10 (3), doi:10.1349/PS1.1537-0852.A.419
