= Koro language (Vanuatu) =

Austronesian language spoken in Vanuatu

Koro
- Pronunciation: [kʊrʊ]
- Native to: Vanuatu
- Region: Gaua
- Native speakers: 250 (2012)
- Language family: Austronesian: Malayo-Polynesian; Oceanic; Southern Oceanic; North-Central Vanuatu; North Vanuatu; Torres-Banks; Koro

Language codes
- ISO 639-3: krf
- Glottolog: koro1318
- ELP: Koro (Vanuatu)
- Koro is classified as Definitely Endangered by the UNESCO Atlas of the World's Languages in Danger.

Koro is an Oceanic language spoken on Gaua island in Vanuatu. Its 280 speakers live in the village of Koro, on the south coast of Gaua.

Koro is a distinct language from its immediate neighbours, Dorig (300 sp.) and Olrat (4 sp.).

== Name ==
The name Koro, spelled natively as Kōrō [kʊrʊ], is an endonym referring to the village.

== Phonology ==
Koro has eight phonemic vowels. These include seven monophthongs /i ɪ ɛ a ɔ ʊ u/ and one diphthong /ɛ͡a/.

	Front	Back
Near-close	i ⟨i⟩	u ⟨u⟩
Close-mid	ɪ ⟨ē⟩	ʊ ⟨ō⟩
Open-mid	ɛ ⟨e⟩	ɔ ⟨o⟩
Open	a ⟨a⟩	

The diphthong [ɛ͡a] is spelled as ⟨ä⟩.

== Grammar ==
The system of personal pronouns in Koro contrasts clusivity, and distinguishes four numbers (singular, dual, trial, plural).

Spatial reference in Koro is based on a system of geocentric (absolute) directionals, which is typical of Oceanic languages.

== Notes and references ==
=== Bibliography ===
- François, Alexandre (2005), "Unraveling the history of the vowels of seventeen northern Vanuatu languages" (PDF), Oceanic Linguistics, 44 (2): 443–504, doi:10.1353/ol.2005.0034, S2CID 131668754
- —— (2011), "Social ecology and language history in the northern Vanuatu linkage: A tale of divergence and convergence" (PDF), Journal of Historical Linguistics, 1 (2): 175–246, doi:10.1075/jhl.1.2.03fra, hdl:1885/29283.
- —— (2012), "The dynamics of linguistic diversity: Egalitarian multilingualism and power imbalance among northern Vanuatu languages" (PDF), International Journal of the Sociology of Language, 2012 (214): 85–110, doi:10.1515/ijsl-2012-0022, S2CID 145208588
- —— (2015). "The ins and outs of up and down: Disentangling the nine geocentric space systems of Torres and Banks languages" (PDF). In Alexandre François; Sébastien Lacrampe; Michael Franjieh; Stefan Schnell (eds.). The languages of Vanuatu: Unity and diversity. Studies in the Languages of Island Melanesia. Canberra: Asia-Pacific Linguistics. pp. 137–195. hdl:1885/14819. ISBN 978-1-922185-23-5.
- —— (2016), "The historical morphology of personal pronouns in northern Vanuatu" (PDF), in Pozdniakov, Konstantin (ed.), Comparatisme et reconstruction : tendances actuelles, Faits de Langues, vol. 47, Bern: Peter Lang, pp. 25–60
- —— (2021). "In love with an eel man". Pangloss Collection. Paris: CNRS.
