= Torres–Banks languages =

Group of related Oceanic languages in northern Vanuatu

Torres–Banks
- Geographic distribution: Torres Islands and Banks Islands, Torba Province, northern Vanuatu
- Linguistic classification: Austronesian: Malayo-Polynesian; Oceanic; Southern Oceanic; North-Central Vanuatu; North Vanuatu; Torres–Banks
- Proto-language: Proto-Torres-Banks

Language codes
- Glottolog: torr1262

The Torres–Banks languages form a linkage of Southern Oceanic languages spoken in the Torres Islands and Banks Islands of northern Vanuatu.

== Languages ==
François (2011) recognizes 17 languages spoken by 9,400 people in 50 villages, including 16 living (3 of which are moribund) and one extinct language.

The 17 languages, ranked from northwest to southeast, are:

Language	Number of speakers	ISO 639-3 code	Island(s) spoken
Hiw	280	[hiw]	Hiw
Lo-Toga	580	[lht]	Tegua, Lo, Toga
Lehali	200	[tql]	Ureparapara
Löyöp	240	[urr]	Ureparapara
Volow	extinct	[mlv]	Mota Lava
Mwotlap	2100	[mlv]	Mota Lava
Lemerig	2 (moribund)	[lrz]	Vanua Lava
Vera'a	500	[vra]	Vanua Lava
Vurës	2000	[msn]	Vanua Lava
Mwesen	10 (moribund)	[msn]	Vanua Lava
Mota	750	[mtt]	Mota
Nume	700	[tgs]	Gaua
Dorig	300	[wwo]	Gaua
Koro	250	[krf]	Gaua
Olrat	3 (moribund)	[olr]	Gaua
Lakon	800	[lkn]	Gaua
Mwerlap	1100	[mrm]	Merelava

== Comparative studies ==
A. François has published several studies comparing various features of the Torres–Banks languages:

- François (2005): inventories of vowel systems, and their historical development;
- François (2007): systems of noun articles, and their historical development;
- François (2009): how several languages grammaticalized a set of light personal pronouns into markers for "aorist" aspect;
- François (2011): how Torres–Banks languages tend to show structural isomorphism, yet lexical diversity;
- François (2012): a sociolinguistic study of the area.
- François (2013): etymological reconstruction of spiritual terms in Torres–Banks languages;
- François (2015): systems of geocentric space directionals, and their historical development;
- François (2016): historical morphology of personal pronouns;
- François (2026a: 429-441): apprehensional constructions;
- François (2026b: 115, 127-128): markers of negation.

== Genealogical structure of the Torres–Banks linkage ==
The internal structure of the Torres–Banks linkage was assessed based on the Comparative method, and presented in the framework of historical glottometry (François 2014, 2017; Kalyan & François 2018).

Kalyan & François (2018: 81) identified the following best-supported subgroups (in decreasing order of genealogical closeness):

- Mwotlap – Volow
- Hiw – Lo-Toga
- Vurës – Mwesen
- Lemerig – Vera'a
- Koro – Olrat – Lakon
- Dorig – Koro – Olrat – Lakon
- Olrat – Lakon
- Lehali – Löyöp – Mwotlap – Volow
- 15 Banks languages together (Lehali – Löyöp – Mwotlap – Volow – Lemerig – Vera'a – Vurës – Mwesen – Mota – Nume – Dorig – Koro – Olrat – Lakon – Mwerlap)

It is possible that the strict common ancestor of any two members of the Torres–Banks linkage is Proto-Oceanic itself. Evidence of this is found in the irregular preservation of final consonants in Lakon (via a now-lost paragogic vowel) in some words, consonants which were lost in most other languages.

== Proto-language ==
The common ancestor of all Torres-Banks languages is called Proto-Torres–Banks, viewed here as a mutually-intelligible chain of dialects within the Torres and Banks islands.
