= Pangloss =

Pangloss (from Greek, meaning all languages) may refer to:

- Pangloss, a fictional character in the 1759 novel Candide by Voltaire
- Dr. Peter Pangloss, a fictional character in the 1797 play The Heir at Law by George Colman the Younger
- Pangloss Collection, a digital library of audio recordings in endangered languages
