= Aplow =

Village on Motalava island in Vanuatu

Coordinates: 13°40′18″S 167°42′27″E

Aplow, Valuwa, or Valuga, is a village located on the eastern part of Mota Lava, in the Banks Islands of Vanuatu. Located close to it is the island's airport, Valua Airport.

Aplow also designates the whole district around this village, corresponding to the eastern side of the island; in this sense, Aplow contrasts with Mwotlap, which strictly speaking designates the western half of Motalava island.

The area of Aplow used to be home of a communalect (language or dialect) known as Volow. Volow become extinct in the 1980s, as its speakers adopted the dominant language Mwotlap from the western side.

== Name ==
The name Aplow [apˈlʊw] is the name of the village in Mwotlap, which is the dominant language spoken today on the island. The same village was originally known as Volow [βʊˈlʊw] in the now extinct language of the same name.

Finally, the village, as well as the district around it, is called in Mota as Valuwa [βaluwa] (from the Maligo dialect) or Valuga [βaluɣa] (from the Veverao dialect). The form Valua is a misspelling of the Maligo dialect form.

All these forms descend from a reconstructed *βaluwa in Proto-Torres-Banks, e.g. *βaˈluwa > [βʊlʊw]. The Mwotlap form incorporates a locative prefix: *ˌa-βaˈluwa > *aβˈlʊw > [apˈlʊw].
