= Löyöp language =

Austronesian language spoken in Vanuatu

Löyöp
- Pronunciation: [løjøp]
- Native to: Vanuatu
- Region: Ureparapara, formerly Rowa Islands
- Native speakers: 240 (2010)
- Language family: Austronesian: Malayo-Polynesian; Oceanic; Southern Oceanic; North-Central Vanuatu; North Vanuatu; Torres-Banks; Löyöp

Language codes
- ISO 639-3: urr
- Glottolog: leha1244
- ELP: Löyöp
- Löyöp is classified as Vulnerable by the UNESCO Atlas of the World's Languages in Danger.

Löyöp [løjøp] (formerly known as Lehalurup) is an Oceanic language spoken by about 240 people, on the east coast of Ureparapara Island in the Banks Islands of Vanuatu. It is distinct from Lehali, the language spoken on the west coast of the same island.

The language was originally native to the Rowa Islands, having been brought to Ureparapara around the 1930s when a tsunami struck the Reef Islands and forced the speakers to relocate.

It is considered a vulnerable language by UNESCO.

== Name ==
The name Löyöp [løjøp] used since 2009 refers to the area called "Divers' Bay" in English, in the eastern part of Ureparapara. It derives from a Proto-Torres-Banks form *loroβi, with cognates in Lehali Loyēp [lɔjɪp]. The now-deprecated name Lehalurup once used by certain authors (e.g. Tryon) is likely a result from a transcription error, possibly under the influence of neighboring Lehali.

== Phonology ==
Löyöp phonemically contrasts 16 consonants and 11 vowels.

=== Consonants ===
Löyöp consonants
		Labiovelar	Bilabial	Alveolar	Post-alveolar	Dorsal
Nasal		ŋ͡mʷ ⟨m̄⟩	m ⟨m⟩	n ⟨n⟩		ŋ ⟨n̄⟩
Stop	voiceless	k͡pʷ ⟨q⟩	p ⟨p⟩	t ⟨t⟩	t͡ʃ ⟨j⟩	k ⟨k⟩
Stop	prenasalized			ⁿd ⟨d⟩		
Fricative			β ⟨v⟩	s ⟨s⟩		ɣ ⟨g⟩
Approximant		w ⟨w⟩		l ⟨l⟩		j ⟨y⟩

=== Vowels ===
These are ten short monophthongs /i ɪ ɛ æ a œ ø y ɔ ʊ/, and one diphthong /i͡ɛ/.

Löyöp vowels
	Front		Back
	plain	round	Back
Close	i ⟨i⟩	y ⟨u⟩	
Near-close	ɪ ⟨ē⟩	ø ⟨ö⟩	ʊ ⟨ō⟩
Open-mid	ɛ ⟨e⟩	œ ⟨ë⟩	ɔ ⟨o⟩
Near-open	æ ⟨ä⟩		
Open	a ⟨a⟩		

== Grammar ==
The system of personal pronouns in Löyöp contrasts clusivity, and distinguishes four numbers (singular, dual, trial, plural).

Spatial reference in Löyöp is based on a system of geocentric (absolute) directionals, which is in part typical of Oceanic languages, and yet innovative.

== Bibliography ==
- Tryon, D. T. (1972). "The languages of the New Hebrides: A checklist and general survey". In Beaumont, C.; Tryon, D. T.; Wurm, S. A. (eds.). Papers in Linguistics of Melanesia, Series A-33. Pacific Linguistics.
- François, Alexandre (2009), "Verbal aspect and personal pronouns: The history of aorist markers in north Vanuatu" (PDF), in Pawley, Andrew; Adelaar, Alexander (eds.), Austronesian historical linguistics and culture history: A festschrift for Bob Blust, vol. 601, Canberra: Pacific Linguistics, pp. 179–195
- —— (2011), "Social ecology and language history in the northern Vanuatu linkage: A tale of divergence and convergence" (PDF), Journal of Historical Linguistics, 1 (2): 175–246, doi:10.1075/jhl.1.2.03fra, hdl:1885/29283, S2CID 42217419.
- —— (2012), "The dynamics of linguistic diversity: Egalitarian multilingualism and power imbalance among northern Vanuatu languages" (PDF), International Journal of the Sociology of Language, 214: 85–110, doi:10.1515/ijsl-2012-0022, S2CID 145208588
- —— (2015). "The ins and outs of up and down: Disentangling the nine geocentric space systems of Torres and Banks languages" (PDF). In Alexandre François; Sébastien Lacrampe; Michael Franjieh; Stefan Schnell (eds.). The languages of Vanuatu: Unity and diversity. Studies in the Languages of Island Melanesia. Canberra: Asia-Pacific Linguistics. pp. 137–195. hdl:1885/14819. ISBN 978-1-922185-23-5.
- —— (2016), "The historical morphology of personal pronouns in northern Vanuatu" (PDF), in Pozdniakov, Konstantin (ed.), Comparatisme et reconstruction : tendances actuelles, Faits de Langues, vol. 47, Bern: Peter Lang, pp. 25–60
- François, Alexandre (2021). "Presentation of the Löyöp language and audio archive". Pangloss Collection. Paris: CNRS.
