= Warohunugamwanehaora =

Melanesian folk character

Warohunugamwanehaora is a character in San Cristoval folklore in Melanesia; he is similar to Qat and Maui, being the youngest of a band of brothers.

== Mythology ==
The youngest of a family of brothers, Warohunugamwanehaora is born and grows to adulthood all in one day. His brothers fear and envy him for his cleverness and strength and under the guidance of the oldest brother, Warohunugaraiia, they try several times to kill him. The first time, they trick Warohunugamwanehaora into a deep hole and drop a post on him, but when they turn around there he is, sitting on top of the pole. Then they try sending him against various vicious animals—a giant clam, a man-eating fish, a wild boar—hoping he will be killed, but each time Warohunugamwanehaora is victorious and when they arrive home he is sitting there waiting for them. Next they try magic, sending the young man up a betel tree and enchanting the tree to become so tall that he will never be able to get back. But Warohunugamwanehaora causes the tree to bend down until it touches the ground in front of his house and again, when the brothers arrive home there he is awaiting them.

Finally the brothers decide they must kill him themselves, and devise a plan to cook and eat him. With Warohunugamwanehaora's help they build a mighty oven, and when the fire under it is hot enough they throw him in and pile huge rocks on the top. The oven gets hotter and hotter until even the stones piled on top grow soft; although they feel sure their plan has succeeded, the brothers (wary by this time) wait until the oven is completely cold before opening it. Just as they are pulling the last stones away a voice behind them says, "Is it done, my brothers?" and there behind them, sure enough, is Warohunugamwanehaora.

At last out of patience with his brothers, particularly the eldest who has been the instigator of the repeated murder attempts, Warohunugamwanehaora builds a very small oven and a very small fire and tells Warohunugaraiia to get in. Thinking he could not be harmed by such a small cookfire, the eldest brother gets in and is promptly roasted to a turn, and Warohunugamwanehaora and the rest devour him.
