= Lakon language =

Austronesian language spoken in Vanuatu

Lakon
- Lakona, Vure
- Pronunciation: [laˈkɔn]
- Native to: Vanuatu
- Region: Gaua
- Native speakers: 800 (2012)
- Language family: Austronesian: Malayo-Polynesian; Oceanic; Southern Oceanic; North-Central Vanuatu; North Vanuatu; Torres-Banks; Lakon
- Dialects: Qatareu; Vure; Toglatareu; Togla

Language codes
- ISO 639-3: lkn
- Glottolog: lako1245
- ELP: Lakon
- Lakon is classified as Vulnerable by the UNESCO Atlas of the World's Languages in Danger.

Lakon is an Oceanic language, spoken on the west coast of Gaua island in Vanuatu.

== Names ==
The language name Lakon [laˈkɔn] refers originally to the area where it is spoken—namely Lakona Bay, corresponding to the west coast of Gaua. The alternative name Lakona [lakona] is from the Mota language. These names are derived from a Proto-Torres-Banks form *laᵑgona, of unknown meaning.

Lakon had four dialects, named Qatareu (Qätärew, [k͡pʷætæˈrɛw]), Vure (Vurē, [βuˈrɪ]), Toglatareu, and Togla.

== Phonology ==
=== Consonants ===
Lakon has 16 phonemic consonants.

Lakon consonants
	Labiovelar	Bilabial	Alveolar	Palatal	Dorsal	Glottal
Plosive	k͡pʷ ⟨q⟩	p ⟨p⟩	t ⟨t⟩	tʃ ⟨j⟩	k ⟨k⟩	
Nasal	ŋ͡mʷ ⟨m̄⟩	m ⟨m⟩	n ⟨n⟩		ŋ ⟨n̄⟩	
Fricative		β ~ ɸ ⟨v⟩	s ⟨s⟩		ɣ ⟨g⟩	h ⟨h⟩
Rhotic			r ⟨r⟩			
Lateral			l ⟨l⟩			
Approximant	w ⟨w⟩					

The glottal stop [ʔ] only occurs before vowels in syllable-initial position. While non-phonemic, it is sometimes noted in the orthography, using a ⟨’⟩ mark.

=== Vowels ===
Lakon has 16 phonemic vowels. These include 8 short /i ɪ ɛ æ a ɔ ʊ u/ and 8 long vowels /iː ɪː ɛː æː aː ɔː ʊː uː/.

Lakon vowels
	Front	Back
Near-close	i ⟨i⟩ ∙ iː ⟨ii⟩	u ⟨u⟩ ∙ uː ⟨uu⟩
Close-mid	ɪ ⟨ē⟩ ∙ ɪː ⟨ēē⟩	ʊ ⟨ō⟩ ∙ ʊː ⟨ōō⟩
Open-mid	ɛ ⟨e⟩ ∙ ɛː ⟨ee⟩	ɔ ⟨o⟩ ∙ ɔː ⟨oo⟩
Near-open	æ ⟨ä⟩ ∙ æː ⟨ää⟩	
Open	a ⟨a⟩ ∙ aː ⟨aa⟩	

Historically, the phonemicisation of vowel length originates in the compensatory lengthening of short vowels when the alveolar trill /r/ was lost syllable-finally. This is considered to be a very recent change, perhaps within the last century, as Codrington still indicates the trill syllable-finally. However, the 1897 Book of Common Prayer in Lakon shows loss of the trill, as evidenced by tataa [taˈtaː] "prayer" (spelled as tata) for Mota tataro.

== Grammar ==
The system of personal pronouns in Lakon contrasts clusivity, and distinguishes four numbers (singular, dual, trial, plural).

Spatial reference in Lakon is based on a system of geocentric (absolute) directionals, which is typical of Oceanic languages.

== Bibliography ==
- François, Alexandre (2005), "Unraveling the history of the vowels of seventeen northern Vanuatu languages" (PDF), Oceanic Linguistics, 44 (2): 443–504, doi:10.1353/ol.2005.0034, S2CID 131668754
- —— (2011), "Social ecology and language history in the northern Vanuatu linkage: A tale of divergence and convergence" (PDF), Journal of Historical Linguistics, 1 (2): 175–246, doi:10.1075/jhl.1.2.03fra, hdl:1885/29283, S2CID 42217419.
- —— (2012), "The dynamics of linguistic diversity: Egalitarian multilingualism and power imbalance among northern Vanuatu languages" (PDF), International Journal of the Sociology of Language, 2012 (214): 85–110, doi:10.1515/ijsl-2012-0022, S2CID 145208588
- —— (2015). "The ins and outs of up and down: Disentangling the nine geocentric space systems of Torres and Banks languages" (PDF). In Alexandre François; Sébastien Lacrampe; Michael Franjieh; Stefan Schnell (eds.). The languages of Vanuatu: Unity and diversity. Studies in the Languages of Island Melanesia. Canberra: Asia-Pacific Linguistics. pp. 137–195. hdl:1885/14819. ISBN 978-1-922185-23-5.
- —— (2016), "The historical morphology of personal pronouns in northern Vanuatu" (PDF), in Pozdniakov, Konstantin (ed.), Comparatisme et reconstruction : tendances actuelles, Faits de Langues, vol. 47, Bern: Peter Lang, pp. 25–60
- —— (2022). "Presentation of the Lakon language, and audio archive". Pangloss Collection. Paris: CNRS.
