= Hiw language =

Austronesian language spoken in Vanuatu

Hiw
- Pronunciation: [hiw]
- Native to: Vanuatu
- Region: Hiw
- Native speakers: 280 (2012)
- Language family: Austronesian: Malayo-Polynesian; Oceanic; Southern Oceanic; North-Central Vanuatu; North Vanuatu; Torres-Banks; Hiw

Language codes
- ISO 639-3: hiw
- Glottolog: hiww1237
- ELP: Hiw
- Hiw is classified as Definitely Endangered by the UNESCO Atlas of the World's Languages in Danger.

Hiw (sometimes spelled Hiu) is an Oceanic language spoken on the island of Hiw, in the Torres Islands of Vanuatu. With about 280 speakers, Hiw is considered endangered.

Hiw is distinct from Lo-Toga, the other language of the Torres group. All Hiw speakers are bilingual in Bislama, and most also speak Lo-Toga.

== Name ==
The language is named after the island.

== Phonology ==
=== Vowels ===
Hiw has 9 phonemic vowels. These are all short monophthongs /i ɪ e ʉ ɵ ə o ɔ a/:

Hiw vowels
	Front	Central	Back
Close	i ⟨i⟩	ʉ ⟨u⟩	
Near-close	ɪ ⟨ē⟩		
Close-mid	e ⟨ë⟩	ɵ ⟨ö⟩	o ⟨ō⟩
Mid		ə ⟨e⟩	
Open-mid			ɔ ⟨o⟩
Open		a ⟨a⟩	

- /ʉ ɵ ə/ are rounded.
- /i/ is realized as a glide [j] whenever it is followed by another vowel.
- [u] occurs as an allophone of /ʉ/ and /ə/ after labiovelars. /ʉ/ is always realized [u] in this environment, while /ə/ only in pre-tonic syllables, and then only optionally.

=== Consonants ===
Hiw has 14 consonants.

Hiw consonants
	Bilabial	Alveolar	Palatal	Velar	
	Bilabial	Alveolar	Palatal	plain	labial
Nasal	m ⟨m⟩	n ⟨n⟩		ŋ ⟨n̄⟩	ŋʷ ⟨n̄w⟩
Plosive	p ⟨p⟩	t ⟨t⟩		k ⟨k⟩	kʷ ⟨q⟩
Fricative	β ⟨v⟩	s ⟨s⟩		ɣ ⟨g⟩	
Approximant		(l) ⟨l⟩	j ⟨y⟩	ɡ͡ʟ ⟨r̄⟩	w ⟨w⟩
Trill		(r) ⟨r⟩			

- The historical phoneme /*l/ has shifted to /j/, which is unique within the Torres–Banks languages. /l/ only appears in loanwords.
- /ɡ͡ʟ/ may be realized as an affricate [ɡʟ̝], a prestopped approximant [ᶢʟ], or a laterally released plosive [ɡᶫ]. Word-finally, it can surface as [k𝼄].
- Hiw is the only Austronesian language whose consonant inventory includes /ɡ͡ʟ/; it is Hiw's only native liquid. Historically, this complex segment was a voiced alveolar trill /r/ (which is why it is spelled ⟨r̄⟩).
- The voiced alveolar trill, spelled ⟨r⟩, appears in recent loanwords: e.g. 'bread' > perët /pəret/. In some other, perhaps older, loanwords, alveolar trills have been borrowed as velar laterals: e.g. 'graveyard' > kër̄ëvyat /keɡ͡ʟeβjat/.

=== Stress ===
Stress is predictable in Hiw, except in the case of words which only contain /ə/.

Generally, primary stress falls on the last syllable which does not contain /ə/. For example: [mɔˈwɪ] 'moon', [ˈwɔtəjə] 'maybe'. In the case of words whose only vowel is schwa, stress is unpredictable: thus [βəˈjə] 'pandanus leaf' is oxytone and [ˈtəpjə] 'dish' is paroxytone. These are the only polysyllabic words that may have a stressed schwa.

Polysyllabic words have secondary stress, which falls on every second syllable from the primary stressed syllable, going leftwards. For example: [ˌβəɣəˈβaɣə] 'speak'.

=== Phonotactics ===
The syllable structure of Hiw is CCVC, where the only obligatory element is V: e.g. /tg͡ʟɔɣ/ 'throw (pl)'; /βti/ 'star'; /kʷg͡ʟɪ/ 'dolphin'; /g͡ʟɵt/ 'tie'.

Hiw allows consonant gemination, word-medially and initially. These geminated consonants can be analyzed as C_{1}C_{2} consonant clusters in which both consonants happen to be identical. An example of gemination is in /tin/ 'buy' vs /ttin/ 'hot'. Consonants and vowels may also be lengthened for expressive purposes, for example: /ne maβə/ ‘it’s heavy’ becomes [ne mːaβə] ‘it’s so heavy!’.

Hiw's phonology follows the sonority sequencing principle, with the following language-specific sonority hierarchy:

vowels > glides > liquids > nasals > obstruents

In syllable onsets, C_{1} may not be more sonorous than C_{2}. Fricatives and plosives are not distinguished with regard to sonority.

Even though /w/ is always pronounced as an approximant, it is best treated as an obstruent with regards to sonority: this interpretation accounts for words like /wte/ 'small', which would otherwise constitute a sonority reversal.

Phonological evidence shows that /ɡ͡ʟ/ patterns as a liquid, more sonorous than nasals but less sonorous than the glide /j/. Unlike the obstruents, /ɡ͡ʟ/ cannot be followed by a nasal. However, it can come after a nasal, as in /mɡ͡ʟe/ ‘wrath’. The only consonant found after /ɡ͡ʟ/ is /j/ - e.g. /ɡ͡ʟje/ ‘sweep’.

=== Orthography ===
Orthography
Grapheme
a	e	ë	ē	g	i	k	m	n	n̄	n̄w	o	ö	ō	p	q	r̄	s	t	u	v	w	y
IPA
a	ə	e	ɪ	ɣ	i	k	m	n	ŋ	ŋʷ	ɔ	ɵ	o	p	kʷ	g͡ʟ	s	t	ʉ	β	w	j

== Grammar ==
Hiw has a similar grammatical structure to the other living Torres–Banks languages.

In terms of lexical flexibility, Hiw has been assessed to be “grammatically flexible”, but “lexically rigid”. The vast majority of the language's lexemes belongs to just one word class (noun, adjective, verb, adverb…); yet each of those word classes is compatible with a large number of syntactic functions.

The language presents various forms of verb serialization.

Its system of personal pronouns contrasts clusivity, and distinguishes three numbers (singular, dual, plural).

Together with its neighbour Lo-Toga, Hiw has developed a rich system of verbal number, whereby certain verbs alternate their root depending on the number of their main participant. Hiw has 33 such pairs of suppletive verbs, which is far more than is typical among languages that have this feature.

Spatial reference in Hiw is based on a system of geocentric (absolute) directionals. That space system is largely reminiscent of the one widespread among Oceanic languages, yet also shows some innovations that make it unique.

== Bibliography ==
- François, Alexandre (2005). "Unraveling the History of the Vowels of Seventeen Northern Vanuatu Languages" (PDF). Oceanic Linguistics. 44 (2): 443–504. doi:10.1353/ol.2005.0034. S2CID 131668754.
- —— (2010a). "Phonotactics and the prestopped velar lateral of Hiw: Resolving the ambiguity of a complex segment" (PDF). Phonology. 27 (3): 393–434. doi:10.1017/s0952675710000205. S2CID 62628417.
- —— (2010b). "Pragmatic demotion and clause dependency: On two atypical subordinating strategies in Lo-Toga and Hiw (Torres, Vanuatu)" (PDF). In Bril, Isabelle (ed.). Clause hierarchy and Clause linking: The Syntax and Pragmatics interface. Studies in Language Companion Series 121. Amsterdam: Benjamins. pp. 499–548. ISBN 978-90-272-0588-9.
- —— (2011). "Social ecology and language history in the northern Vanuatu linkage: A tale of divergence and convergence" (PDF). Journal of Historical Linguistics. 1 (2): 175–246. doi:10.1075/jhl.1.2.03fra. hdl:1885/29283. S2CID 42217419.
- —— (2012). "The dynamics of linguistic diversity: Egalitarian multilingualism and power imbalance among northern Vanuatu languages" (PDF). International Journal of the Sociology of Language. 214: 85–110. doi:10.1515/ijsl-2012-0022. S2CID 145208588.
- —— (2015). "The ins and outs of up and down: Disentangling the nine geocentric space systems of Torres and Banks languages" (PDF). In François, Alexandre; Lacrampe, Sébastien; Franjieh, Michael; Schnell, Stefan (eds.). The languages of Vanuatu: Unity and diversity. Studies in the Languages of Island Melanesia. Canberra: Asia-Pacific Linguistics. pp. 137–195. hdl:1885/14819. ISBN 978-1-922185-23-5.
- —— (2016). "The historical morphology of personal pronouns in northern Vanuatu" (PDF). In Pozdniakov, Konstantin (ed.). Comparatisme et reconstruction : tendances actuelles. Faits de Langues. Vol. 47. Bern: Peter Lang. pp. 25–60.
- —— (2017). "The economy of word classes in Hiw, Vanuatu: Grammatically flexible, lexically rigid" (PDF). Studies in Language. 41 (2): 294–357. doi:10.1075/sl.41.2.03fra.
- —— (2019). "Verbal number in Lo–Toga and Hiw: The emergence of a lexical paradigm" (PDF). Transactions of the Philological Society. 117 (3): 338–371. doi:10.1111/1467-968X.12168. S2CID 210543649.
- —— (2021). "Presentation of the Hiw language and audio archive". Pangloss Collection. Paris: CNRS.
