= Nume language =

Austronesian language spoken in Vanuatu

Nume
- Tarasag, Gog
- Native to: Vanuatu
- Region: Gaua
- Native speakers: 700 (2012)
- Language family: Austronesian: Malayo-Polynesian; Oceanic; Southern Oceanic; North-Central Vanuatu; North Vanuatu; Torres-Banks; Nume

Language codes
- ISO 639-3: tgs
- Glottolog: nume1241
- ELP: Nume

Nume (also called Gog and Tarasag), is an Oceanic language spoken on Gaua island in Vanuatu. Its 700 speakers live on the northeast coast of Gaua.

Nume is a distinct language from its immediate southern neighbors, Mwerlap and Dorig.

== Names ==
The name Nume originates in the name of a village, now abandoned. Tarasag is currently the community's main village. The alternate name Gog refers to the broader area, and by extension, to the island.

== Phonology ==
Nume has 15 consonant phonemes.

Consonants
	Labiovelar	Bilabial	Alveolar	Dorsal
Voiceless stop	k͡pʷ ⟨q⟩		t ⟨t⟩	k ⟨k⟩
Prenasalized stop		ᵐb ⟨b⟩	ⁿd ⟨d⟩	
Fricative		β ⟨v⟩	s ⟨s⟩	ɣ ⟨g⟩
Nasal	ŋ͡mʷ ⟨m̄⟩	m ⟨m⟩	n ⟨n⟩	ŋ ⟨n̄⟩
Rhotic			r ⟨r⟩	
Approximant	w ⟨w⟩		l ⟨l⟩	

- /β/ can also be heard as [ɸ] among speakers.

Nume has 7 phonemic vowels, which are all short monophthongs.

Vowels
	Front	Back
Close	i ⟨i⟩	u ⟨u⟩
Near-close	ɪ ⟨ē⟩	ʊ ⟨ō⟩
Open-mid	ɛ ⟨e⟩	ɔ ⟨o⟩
Open	a ⟨a⟩	

== Grammar ==
The system of personal pronouns in Nume contrasts clusivity, and distinguishes four numbers (singular, dual, trial, plural).

Spatial reference in Nume is based on a system of geocentric (absolute) directionals, which is typical of Oceanic languages.

== Bibliography ==
- François, Alexandre (2005a), "Unraveling the history of the vowels of seventeen northern Vanuatu languages" (PDF), Oceanic Linguistics, 44 (2): 443–504, doi:10.1353/ol.2005.0034, S2CID 131668754
- François, Alexandre (2011), "Social ecology and language history in the northern Vanuatu linkage: A tale of divergence and convergence" (PDF), Journal of Historical Linguistics, 1 (2): 175–246, doi:10.1075/jhl.1.2.03fra, hdl:1885/29283, S2CID 42217419.
- François, Alexandre (2012), "The dynamics of linguistic diversity: Egalitarian multilingualism and power imbalance among northern Vanuatu languages" (PDF), International Journal of the Sociology of Language, 214: 85–110, doi:10.1515/ijsl-2012-0022, S2CID 145208588
- François, Alexandre (2015). "The ins and outs of up and down: Disentangling the nine geocentric space systems of Torres and Banks languages" (PDF). In Alexandre François; Sébastien Lacrampe; Michael Franjieh; Stefan Schnell (eds.). The languages of Vanuatu: Unity and diversity. Studies in the Languages of Island Melanesia. Canberra: Asia-Pacific Linguistics. pp. 137–195. hdl:1885/14819. ISBN 978-1-922185-23-5.
- François, Alexandre (2016), "The historical morphology of personal pronouns in northern Vanuatu" (PDF), in Pozdniakov, Konstantin (ed.), Comparatisme et reconstruction : tendances actuelles, Faits de Langues, vol. 47, Bern: Peter Lang, pp. 25–60
- François, Alexandre (2022). "Presentation of the Nume language, and audio archive". Pangloss Collection. Paris: CNRS.
