= Vurës language =

Austronesian language spoken in Vanuatu

Vurës
- Vureas
- Pronunciation: [βyˈrœs]
- Native to: Vanuatu
- Region: Vanua Lava
- Native speakers: 2,000 (2016)
- Language family: Austronesian: Malayo-Polynesian; Oceanic; Southern Oceanic; North-Central Vanuatu; North Vanuatu; Torres-Banks; Vurës

Language codes
- ISO 639-3: msn (shared with Mwesen)
- Glottolog: vure1239
- ELP: Vurës
- Vurës is not endangered according to the classification system of the UNESCO Atlas of the World's Languages in Danger

A Vurës speaker, recorded in Vanuatu.

Vurës (Vureas, Vures) is an Oceanic language spoken in the southern area of Vanua Lava Island, in the Banks Islands of northern Vanuatu, by about 2000 speakers.

Vurës was described by linguist Catriona Malau, in the form of a grammar and a dictionary.

== Name ==
The name Vurës [βyˈrœs] is named after the bay located in southwestern Vanua Lava in the language itself. In Mota, the bay is referred to as Vureas [βureas]. Cognates in other Torres-Banks languages include Mwotlap Vuyes [βuˈjɛs] and Mwesen Vures [βuˈrɛs]. These come from a reconstructed Proto-Torres–Banks form *βureas(i,u), with an unknown final high vowel.

== Dialectology ==
Vurës shows enough similarities with the neighbouring language Mwesen that the two have sometimes been considered dialects of a single language, sometimes called Mosina (after the name of Mwesen village in the language Mota). A 2018 glottometric study has calculated that Vurës and Mwesen share 85% of their historical innovations, revealing a long history of shared development between these two lects.

However, studies have shown that Mwesen and Vurës have various dissimilarities, such as in their vowel systems, in their noun articles, and in their pronoun paradigms — enough to be considered clearly distinct.

== Phonology ==
=== Consonants ===
		Labial- velar	Labial	Dental	Alveolar	Velar	Glottal
Plosive	voiceless	k͡pʷ ⟨q⟩		t̪ ⟨t⟩		k ⟨k⟩	(ʔ)
Plosive	prenasal		ᵐb ⟨b⟩	ⁿd̪ ⟨d⟩			
Nasal		ŋ͡mʷ ⟨m̄⟩	m ⟨m⟩		n ⟨n⟩	ŋ ⟨n̄⟩	
Fricative			β ⟨v⟩		s ⟨s⟩	ɣ ⟨g⟩	
Liquid	rhotic				r ⟨r⟩		
Liquid	lateral				l ⟨l⟩		
Semivowel		w ⟨w⟩					

- /r/ is also heard as a tap [ɾ] in free variation.
- A glottal stop /ʔ/ only rarely occurs in some words.
- /β/ is heard as [p̚] before a voiceless stop.
- /k͡pʷ/ is heard as [k͡p] when preceding another consonant.
- Stop sounds /t̪ k/ are aspirated [t̪ʰ kʰ] before vowels.

=== Vowels ===
Vurës has 9 phonemic vowels. These are all short monophthongs /i e ɛ a œ ø y ɔ o/:

Vurës vowels
	Front		Back
	plain	round	Back
Close	i ⟨i⟩	y ⟨u⟩	(ʊ) ⟨u⟩
Close-mid	e ⟨ē⟩	ø ⟨ö⟩	o ⟨ō⟩
Open-mid	ɛ ⟨e⟩	œ ⟨ë⟩	ɔ ⟨o⟩
Open	a ⟨a⟩		

- [ʊ] is only a marginal sound that occurs in a small amount of words, mostly borrowings.
- The vowel inventory also includes a diphthong [i͡a] ⟨ia⟩.

== Sample text ==
From an interview on how to bake taro:

La masawre i no no gö mörös nana qan̄ris o qiat, nana qēs o ralēt, qēs lēt lēt qēt, na van me, na sēs o um. Na sēs qēt o um, nana le o ralēt, na tuwegev. No mö tuwegev kal qēt, nana bun kēl o vet ni van lē m̄ēkē qan̄ris, bun bun qēt o vet, mē qēt na ukëg o ev ni ës ti.

In English:

When I want to bake taro, I break up the firewood, break up all the firewood, then I come and I take the stones out of the oven. I take out all the stones from the oven, I get the firewood, and I make the fire. I build up the fire, then I put the stones back on top of the oven, I put all the stones back, then I leave the fire to smoke.
