= Volow language =

Austronesian language formerly spoken in Vanuatu

Volow
- Aplow, Valuwa
- Vōlōw
- Pronunciation: [βʊˈlʊw]
- Native to: Vanuatu
- Region: Mota Lava island, Banks Islands
- Extinct: 1986, with the death of Wanhan; 1 passive speaker (2021)
- Language family: Austronesian: Malayo-Polynesian; Oceanic; Southern Oceanic; North-Central Vanuatu; North Vanuatu; Torres-Banks; Mwotlap; Volow
- Writing system: Latin

Language codes
- ISO 639-3: –
- Glottolog: volo1238
- ELP: Volow
- Volow is classified as Critically Endangered by the UNESCO Atlas of the World's Languages in Danger.

Volow (formerly known as Valuwa or Valuga) is an extinct Torres–Banks language that used to be spoken in the area of Aplow, in the eastern part of the island of Motalava, Vanuatu.

== Name ==
The name Volow [βʊˈlʊw] is originally a placename: it corresponds to the area known today as Aplow, but in the former language Volow rather than in Mwotlap. Now that the Volow dialect has ceased to be used, the name Volow has been forgotten by the modern population. The place is only known through its Mwotlap name Aplow; as for the language variety, it is often referred to, in the Mwotlap language, as na-vap te-Plōw “the language of Aplow”.

The language variety is sometimes also referred to as na-vap ta Dagmel “the language of Dagmel” (in Mwotlap), after the name of an ancient, now abandoned, village.

== Sociolinguistics ==
Volow has receded historically in favor of the now dominant language Mwotlap. It is now only remembered by a single passive speaker, who lives in the village of Aplow — the new name of what was previously known as Volow.

The similarity of Volow with Mwotlap is such that the two communalects may be considered dialects of a single language.

== Phonology ==
Volow phonemically contrasts 16 consonants and 7 vowels.

=== Consonants ===
Consonants
		Labial–velar	Bilabial	Alveolar	Dorsal	Glottal
Nasal		ŋ͡mʷ ⟨m̄⟩	m ⟨m⟩	n ⟨n⟩	ŋ ⟨n̄⟩	
Stop	voiceless			t ⟨t⟩		
Stop	prenasalized	ᵑᵐɡ͡bʷ ⟨q̄⟩	ᵐb ⟨b⟩	ⁿd ⟨d⟩	ᵑɡ ⟨ḡ⟩	
Fricative			β (Note: [p] exists as the allophone of /β/ word-finally.) ⟨v⟩	s ⟨s⟩	ɣ ⟨g⟩	h ⟨h⟩
Approximant		w ⟨w⟩		l ⟨l⟩	j ⟨y⟩	

This consonant inventory includes a typologically rare consonant: a rounded, prenasalised voiced labial-velar plosive [ᵑᵐɡ͡bʷ]: e.g. [n.lɛᵑᵐɡ͡bʷɛβɪn] “woman” (spelled n-leq̄evēn in the local orthography).

Amongst the 17 Torres–Banks languages, Volow is the only one to have preserved the voicing of the proto-phonemes *ᵑg > /ᵑɡ/ and *ᵐbʷ > /ᵑᵐɡ͡bʷ/, which are reconstructed for its ancestor Proto-Torres-Banks. All its neighbours (including Mwotlap) devoiced these to /k/ and /k͡pʷ/ respectively. (Note: Löyöp still preserves some voiced traces of these phonemes, e.g. when it reflects *ᵑg as /ŋ/ in the syllable-final position of modern words: e.g. POc *waᵑga(ŋ) 'canoe' > [n-ɔŋ].)

=== Vowels ===
The seven vowels of Volow are all short monophthongs:

Vowels
	Front	Back
Close	i ⟨i⟩	u ⟨u⟩
Near-close	ɪ ⟨ē⟩	ʊ ⟨ō⟩
Open-mid	ɛ ⟨e⟩	ɔ ⟨o⟩
Open	a ⟨a⟩	
