= Mwotlap language =

Austronesian language spoken in Vanuatu

Mwotlap
- Motlav
- M̄otlap
- Pronunciation: [ŋ͡mʷɔtˈlap]
- Native to: Vanuatu
- Region: Mota Lava island, Banks Islands
- Native speakers: 2,100 (2012)
- Language family: Austronesian: Malayo-Polynesian; Oceanic; Southern Oceanic; North-Central Vanuatu; North Vanuatu; Torres-Banks; Mwotlap
- Dialects: Volow (or a separate language)

Language codes
- ISO 639-3: mlv
- Glottolog: motl1237
- ELP: Motlav
- Mwotlap is not endangered according to the classification system of the UNESCO Atlas of the World's Languages in Danger

Mwotlap (local pronunciation: [ŋ͡mʷɔtˈlap]; formerly known as Motlav) is an Oceanic language spoken by about 2,100 people in Vanuatu. The majority of speakers are found on the island of Motalava in the Banks Islands, with smaller communities in the islands of Ra (or Aya) and Vanua Lava, as well as migrant groups in the two main cities of the country, Santo and Port Vila.

Mwotlap was first described in any detail in 2001, by the linguist Alexandre François.

Volow, which used to be spoken on the same island, may be considered a dialect or a separate language.

== The language ==
A speaker of Mwotlap

=== Name ===
The Mwotlap language is named after the island of Motalava, which is locally known as Mwotlap.

=== Geographic distribution ===
Mwotlap is spoken by about 2,100 people in the Banks Islands, in the North of Vanuatu. Among them, 1,640 live on the island of Mota Lava and its neighbor island, Ra. It is also spoken by a few hundred people living elsewhere in Vanuatu:

- Vanua Lava, particularly in the northeast
- Several other northern Vanuatu islands including Ureparapara, Gaua, and Ambae
- Port-Vila, the capital of Vanuatu
- Luganville, the country's second largest city, located on the island of Espiritu Santo

=== Classification ===
Mwotlap belongs to the Torres–Banks linkage within Southern Oceanic, one of the subgroups of the Oceanic family, itself part of the larger Austronesian phylum.

=== History ===
Robert Henry Codrington, an Anglican priest who studied Melanesian societies, first described Mwotlap in 1885. While focusing mainly on Mota, Codrington dedicated twelve pages of his work The Melanesian Languages to the "Motlav" language. Despite being very short, this description can be used to show several changes that occurred in Mwotlap during the 20th century, such as the change of r to y (a process demonstrated already in the loanword Epyaem 'Abraham'). Furthermore, Codrington described Volow, a language closely related to Mwotlap (sometimes even considered a dialect of Mwotlap). Volow, which is extinct today, was spoken in the east of Mota Lava, in the area of Aplow.

== Phonology ==
Because Mwotlap has been passed down by oral tradition, it has no official writing system. This article uses the orthography devised by linguist Alexandre François, based on the Latin alphabet.

=== Consonants ===
Mwotlap contrasts 16 consonant phonemes in native words, with the addition of /r/ in recent loanwords.

Consonants
		Bilabial	Alveolar	Palatal	Velar	Labiovelar	Glottal
Nasal		m ⟨m⟩	n ⟨n⟩		ŋ ⟨n̄⟩	ŋ͡mʷ ⟨m̄⟩	
Plosive	voiceless	(p)	t ⟨t⟩		k ⟨k⟩	k͡pʷ ⟨q⟩	
Plosive	prenasal	ᵐb ⟨b⟩	ⁿd ⟨d⟩				
Fricative		β ⟨v⟩	s ⟨s⟩		ɣ ⟨g⟩		h ⟨h⟩
Approximant			l ⟨l⟩	j ⟨y⟩		w ⟨w⟩	

- [p] exists as the allophone of /β/ syllable-finally, as in the name of the language, /ŋ͡mʷɔtlaβ/ [ŋ͡mʷɔtˈlap].

=== Vowels ===
Mwotlap has 7 phonemic vowels, which are all short monophthongs, with no diphthongs being present in the language.

Vowels
	Front	Back
Close	i ⟨i⟩	u ⟨u⟩
Near-close	ɪ ⟨ē⟩	ʊ ⟨ō⟩
Open-mid	ɛ ⟨e⟩	ɔ ⟨o⟩
Open	a ⟨a⟩	

=== Prosody ===
Mwotlap is not tonal. Stress always falls on the last syllable of a word. Historically, before syncope of unstressed vowels, it always fell on the penultimate syllable. When syncope took place, the stressed vowel became part of the last syllable.

== Morphophonology ==
=== Syllables ===
Mwotlap's syllable structure is (C)V(C), historically resulting from the syncope of unstressed vowels in pre-modern times. This means that no more than two consonants can follow each other within a word and that no word can start or finish with more than one consonant. Recent loanwords, like skul (from English 'school'), are exceptions to this structure.

When a root beginning with two constants forms the beginning of a word, an epenthetic vowel (the same as the next vowel) is inserted between the two consonants. For example, the root tron̄ 'drunk' can form the following:

- me-tron̄ [mɛt.rɔŋ] '[he] got drunk': the consonants ⟨t⟩ and ⟨r⟩ belong to two different syllables;
- toron̄ [tɔ.rɔŋ] '[they are] getting drunk': the insertion of a vowel between ⟨t⟩ and ⟨r⟩ is necessary to prevent the syllable from starting with two consecutive consonants.

=== Vowel copying ===
Vowel copying is the tendency of certain prefixes to copy the first vowel of the following word. Notable vowel copying prefixes include the article na-, the locative le-, and te-, a prefix used to form adjectives describing origin. These prefixes form nō-vōy 'volcano', ni-hiy 'bone', and to-M̄otlap 'from Mota Lava', but also na-pnō 'island' and na-nye-k 'my blood'. Words stems beginning with two consonants do not permit vowel copying. Thus the stems vōy and hiy allow their vowel to be copied, while the stems vnō and dye do not.

== Syntax ==
Mwotlap is an SVO language: the word order of a sentence is fixed and is always subject-verb-complement-adverbial.

The system of personal pronouns contrasts clusivity, and distinguishes four numbers (singular, dual, trial, plural). Human nouns also have four numbers; as for non-human nouns, they do not inflect for number and are expressed as singulars.

Spatial reference in Mwotlap is based on a system of geocentric (absolute) directionals, which is in part typical of Oceanic languages, and in part innovative.

Like most Oceanic languages, Mwotlap creates its non-verbal predicates without resorting to a copula (like Eng. to be). As a corollary, its grammar is omnipredicative, i.e. most of its word classes (verbs, adjectives, nouns, numerals, etc.) are directly predicative.

Na-lo ‹son̄wul›.
ART-sun ten
'It is ten o'clock.' — liter. "the sun_{[Sbj]} ‹ten›_{[Pred]}."

== Sources ==
=== Main references ===
- François, Alexandre (2001), Contraintes de structures et liberté dans l'organisation du discours. Une description du mwotlap, langue océanienne du Vanuatu (PhD dissertation), Université Paris-IV Sorbonne, p. 1078
- —— (2003), La sémantique du prédicat en mwotlap (Vanuatu), Collection Linguistique de la Société de Linguistique de Paris, Leuven-Paris: Peeters, ISBN 978-90-429-1271-7
- —— (2005b), "A typological overview of Mwotlap, an Oceanic language of Vanuatu" (PDF), Linguistic Typology, 9 (1): 115–146, doi:10.1515/lity.2005.9.1.115, S2CID 55878308
- —— (2025), Mwotlap–English–French online dictionary (Electronic files, work in progress), CNRS

=== Other references ===
- François, Alexandre (2000), "Vowel shifting and cloning in Motlav: historical explanation vs formal description", in Klamer, Marian (ed.), Proceedings of AFLA 7 (The Seventh Meeting of Austronesian Formal Linguistics Association), Amsterdam: Vrije Universiteit Amsterdam, pp. 49–68
- —— (2003), "Of men, hills and winds: Space directionals in Mwotlap" (PDF), Oceanic Linguistics, 42 (2): 407–437, doi:10.1353/ol.2003.0021, S2CID 16908769
- —— (2004), "Chains of freedom: Constraints and creativity in the macro-verb strategies of Mwotlap" (PDF), in Bril, Isabelle; Ozanne-Rivierre, Françoise (eds.), Complex predicates in Oceanic languages: Studies in the dynamics of binding and boundness, Empirical Approaches to Language Typology, Berlin: Mouton de Gruyter, pp. 107–143
- —— (2005a), "Unraveling the history of the vowels of seventeen northern Vanuatu languages" (PDF), Oceanic Linguistics, 44 (2): 443–504, doi:10.1353/ol.2005.0034, S2CID 131668754
- —— (2006), "Serial verb constructions in Mwotlap" (PDF), in Dixon, R.M.W.; Aikhenvald, Alexandra (eds.), Serial Verb Constructions: A cross-linguistic typology, Explorations in Linguistic Typology, Oxford: Oxford University Press, pp. 223–238
- —— (2007), "Noun articles in Torres and Banks languages: Conservation and innovation", in Siegel, Jeff; Lynch, John; Eades, Diana (eds.), Language Description, History and Development: Linguistic indulgence in memory of Terry Crowley, Creole Language Library 30, Amsterdam: Benjamins, pp. 313–326
- —— (2009), "Verbal aspect and personal pronouns: The history of aorist markers in north Vanuatu", in Pawley, Andrew; Adelaar, Alexander (eds.), Austronesian historical linguistics and culture history: A festschrift for Bob Blust, vol. 601, Canberra: Pacific Linguistics, pp. 179–195
- —— (2011), "Social ecology and language history in the northern Vanuatu linkage: A tale of divergence and convergence" (PDF), Journal of Historical Linguistics, 1 (2): 175–246, doi:10.1075/jhl.1.2.03fra, hdl:1885/29283
- —— (2012), "The dynamics of linguistic diversity: Egalitarian multilingualism and power imbalance among northern Vanuatu languages", International Journal of the Sociology of Language, 214: 85–110, doi:10.1515/ijsl-2012-0022, S2CID 145208588
- —— (2015), "The ins and outs of up and down: Disentangling the nine geocentric space systems of Torres and Banks languages" (PDF), in François, Alexandre; Lacrampe, Sébastien; Franjieh, Michael; Schnell, Stefan (eds.), The languages of Vanuatu: Unity and diversity, Studies in the Languages of Island Melanesia, Canberra: Asia-Pacific Linguistics, pp. 137–195, hdl:1885/14819, ISBN 978-1-922185-23-5
- —— (2016), "The historical morphology of personal pronouns in northern Vanuatu" (PDF), in Pozdniakov, Konstantin (ed.), Comparatisme et reconstruction: tendances actuelles, Faits de Langues, vol. 47, Bern: Peter Lang, pp. 25–60
- —— (2026), "Non-verbal predicates in Oceanic languages" (PDF), in Bertinetto, Pier Marco; Ciucci, Luca; Creissels, Denis (eds.), Non-verbal predication in the world's languages: A typological survey, Comparative Handbooks of Linguistics, vol. 2: Africa, Austronesia, Papunesia, Australia, Berlin: DeGruyter Mouton, pp. 1023–1066
