= Robert Henry Codrington =

English priest and anthropologist (1830–1922)

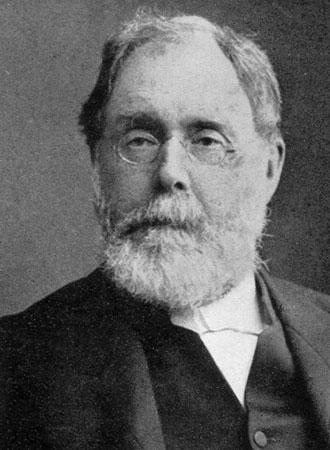

Personal life
- Born: 15 September 1830 Wroughton, United Kingdom
- Died: 11 September 1922 (aged 91) Chichester, United Kingdom

Religious life
- Religion: Church of England

Robert Henry Codrington (15 September 1830, Wroughton, Wiltshire – 11 September 1922) was an Anglican priest and anthropologist who made the first study of Melanesian society and culture. His work is still held as a classic of ethnography.

Codrington wrote, "One of the first duties of a missionary is to try to understand the people among whom he works," and he himself reflected a deep commitment to this value. Codrington worked as headmaster of the Melanesian Mission school on Norfolk Island from 1867 to 1887. Over his many years with the Melanesian people, he gained a deep knowledge of their society, languages, and customs through a close association with them. He also intensively studied "Melanesian languages", including the Mota language.

He popularized the use of the word "mana" in the West, and described mana "as a generalized power that is perceived in objects appearing in any sense out of the ordinary, or that is acquired by persons who possess them."

== Bibliography of works by Codrington ==
- A Sketch of Mota Grammar. (1877). (full text from the Internet Archive).
- The Melanesian Languages. (1885). Oxford: Clarendon Press. (full text from the Internet Archive).
- The Melanesians: Studies in their Anthropology and Folk-Lore. (1891). Oxford: Clarendon Press. (full text from the Internet Archive).
- Codrington, Robert & John Palmer. 1896. A Dictionary of the Language of Mota, Sugarloaf Island, Banks' Islands: With a short grammar and index. London: Society for Promoting Christian Knowledge.
- "Melanesians." Encyclopaedia of Religion and Ethics. Ed. James Hastings. Edinburgh: T. & T. Clark, 8:529–38.
