= Pangloss Collection =

Digital library of audio recordings in endangered languages

The Pangloss Collection is a digital library whose objective is to store and facilitate access to audio recordings in endangered languages of the world. Developed by the LACITO centre of CNRS in Paris, the collection provides free online access to documents of connected, spontaneous speech, in otherwise little-documented languages of all continents.

== Principles ==
=== A sound archive with synchronized transcriptions ===
For the science of linguistics, language is first and foremost spoken language. The medium of spoken language is sound. The Pangloss Collection gives access to original recordings simultaneously with transcriptions and translations, as a resource for further research. After being recorded in its cultural context, texts have been transcribed in collaboration with native speakers.

=== A structured, open architecture ===
The archived data is based on robust standards, as open architecture, in an open format, and may be downloaded under a Creative Commons license. The software used to prepare and disseminate it is open-source. The Pangloss Collection is a member of the Digital Endangered Languages and Music Archive Network (DELAMAN). Its hosting platform, the Cocoon repository, is one of the archives participating in the OLAC network.

== History ==
The collection was initially called the LACITO Archive. The project originated in 1996 from the collaboration of Boyd Michailovsky, linguist at LACITO, with John B. Lowe, engineer; they were later joined by Michel Jacobson, engineer, who developed some tools for the project, and brought it online.

The purpose of the archive was “to conserve, and to make available for research, recorded and transcribed oral traditions and other linguistic materials in (mainly) unwritten languages, giving simultaneous access to sound recordings and text annotation.” The earliest archived corpora in the collection were languages from Nepal, from New Caledonia, from eastern Africa and French Guiana.

The archive has grown steadily since the early 2000s, incorporating corpora from various linguists, whether members of LACITO or not. In 2009, the archive had 200 recordings in 45 languages. In 2014, the (newly renamed) Pangloss Collection had 1,400 recordings in 70 languages.In April 2021, the archive contained 5,038 files in 196 languages and dialects, totalling 780 hours of audio and video recordings. As of 2024, the archive claimed “1,180 hours of audio and video recordings in about 200 languages spoken in forty-three countries”.
