= Mota language =

Austronesian language spoken in Vanuatu

Mota
- Pronunciation: [ŋ͡mʷota]
- Native to: Vanuatu
- Region: Mota island
- Native speakers: 750 (2012)
- Language family: Austronesian: Malayo-Polynesian; Oceanic; Southern Oceanic; North-Central Vanuatu; North Vanuatu; Torres-Banks; Mota
- Dialects: Maligo; Veverao

Language codes
- ISO 639-3: mtt
- Glottolog: mota1237
- ELP: Mota

Mota is an Oceanic language spoken by about 750 people on Mota island, in the Banks Islands of Vanuatu. It is the most conservative Torres–Banks language, and the only one to keep its inherited five-vowel system intact while also preserving most final vowels.

== Name ==
The language is named after the island.

== History ==
During the period 1840–1940, Mota was used as a missionary lingua franca throughout areas of Oceania included in the Melanesian Mission, an Anglican missionary agency. Mota was used on Norfolk Island, in religious education; on other islands with different vernacular languages, it served as the language of liturgical prayers, hymns, and some other religious purposes. Elizabeth Fairburn Colenso translated religious material into the language.

Robert Henry Codrington compiled the first dictionary of Mota (1896), and worked with George Sarawia and others to produce a large number of early publications in this language.

== Phonology ==
=== Phoneme inventory ===
Mota phonemically contrasts 14 consonants and 5 vowels, /i e a o u/. These 19 phonemes form the smallest phonemic inventory among the Torres-Banks languages, because it did not undergo vowel hybridization, and also merged two ancient consonants *ⁿd and *n.

Mota consonants
	Labiovelar	Bilabial	Alveolar	Dorsal
Nasal	ŋ͡mʷ ⟨m̄⟩	m ⟨m⟩	n ⟨n⟩	ŋ ⟨n̄⟩
Stop	k͡pʷ ⟨q⟩	p ⟨p⟩	t ⟨t⟩	k ⟨k⟩
Fricative		β ⟨v⟩ (Note: There is free variation between [β] and [f].)	s ⟨s⟩	ɣ ⟨g⟩
Rhotic			r ⟨r⟩	
Approximant	w ⟨w⟩		l ⟨l⟩	

Mota vowels
	Front	Back
Close	i	u
Close-mid	e	o
Open	a	

There is no stress in Mota, but former penultimate stress must have existed since final high vowels undergo deletion. As a result, penultimate high vowels tend to be deleted, creating new consonant clusters (see below).

=== Phonotactics ===
Proto-Torres–Banks, the ancestor of all Torres–Banks languages including Mota, is reconstructed as a language with open syllables of type {CV}, and no closed syllable {CVC}. That phonotactic profile has been preserved in many words of modern Mota (e.g. salagoro [salaɣoro] “secret enclosure for initiation rituals”, ran̄oran̄o [raŋoraŋo] “Acalypha hispida”), unlike surrounding languages which massively created closed syllables. That said, modern Mota also reflects the regular loss of unstressed high vowels *i and *u ‒ a process already incipient in the earliest attestations of the language (circa 1860) and completed in modern Mota. However, this is thought to be a relatively recent process compared to other Torres-Banks languages, because when Maligo and Veverao dialects are compared, such as Maligo rusag and Veverao rusai (< *rusagi), shows that high vowel loss must have occurred after the irregular loss of Veverao g in the transitive marker -ag/-ai (< *-agi), though Codrington suggests a shift of word-final *-g to -i (*-ag > -ai). As a result, many modern Mota words now feature final consonants and/or consonant clusters: e.g. pal [pal] (< palu) "to steal"; snaga [snaɣa] (< sinaga) "vegetable food"; ptepte [ptepte] (< putepute) "to sit".

=== Literature ===
The New Testament was translated by Robert Henry Codrington, John Palmer, John Coleridge Patteson and L. Pritt all of the Melanesian Mission. The Bible was published in 1912 and then revised in 1928. The New Testament (O Vatavata we Garaqa) was further revised by W.G. Ivens of the Anglican Melanesian Mission and published in 1931 by the British and Foreign Bible Society (BFBS). The Anglican Prayer Book was produced in Mota in 1947.
