= Monophthong =

Pure vowel sound

A monophthong (/ˈmɒnəfθɒŋ, -əp-/ MON-əf-thong, -əp-) or pure vowel is a vowel sound characterized by a relatively stable articulatory configuration throughout its duration. During the production of a monophthong, the tongue does not undergo significant vertical (height) or horizontal (front–back) movement toward a different position of articulation. For this reason, monophthongs are commonly referred to as pure vowels.

Monophthongs are contrasted with diphthongs, in which vowel quality changes (or glides) within a single syllable, and with hiatus, in which two adjacent vowel sounds belong to separate syllables.

The term derives from Ancient Greek μονόφθογγος (monóphthongos, “single sound”), formed from μόνος (mónos, “single”) and φθόγγος (phthóngos, “sound”).

== Sound changes ==
The processes by which monophthongs develop into diphthongs (diphthongization), and by which diphthongs simplify into monophthongs (monophthongization), constitute important mechanisms of language change. These developments frequently interact with broader phonological shifts and may result in systemic changes to vowel inventories.

In a number of languages, historical monophthongization has caused graphemes that originally represented diphthongs to be reinterpreted as denoting monophthongal vowel sounds.

== See also ==
- Diphthong
- Index of phonetics articles
- Semivowel
- Table of vowels
- Triphthong
- Vowel
- Vowel breaking
- Vowel hiatus
