= Co-articulated consonant =

Consonants produced with two places of articulation

IPA: Co-articulated consonants

Plosive	t͡p	k͡p	ɡ͡b
Plosive	q͡p		
Nasal	ŋ͡m		
Fricative/ approximant	ʍ	w	ɥ
Fricative/ approximant	ɧ	ɫ	
Implosive	ɠ̊͜ɓ̥	ɠ͡ɓ	

- IPA help
- audio help
- full chart
- template

Co-articulated consonants or complex consonants are consonants produced with two simultaneous places of articulation. They may be divided into two classes: doubly articulated consonants with two primary places of articulation of the same manner (both stop, or both nasal, etc.), and consonants with secondary articulation; that is, a second articulation not of the same manner.

== Doubly articulated consonants ==
An example of a doubly articulated consonant is the voiceless labial–velar stop [k͡p], which is pronounced simultaneously at the velum (a [k]) and at the lips (a [p]).

In practically all languages of the world that have doubly articulated consonants, these are either clicks or labial–velars.

== Consonants with secondary articulation ==
An example of a consonant with secondary articulation is the voiceless labialized velar stop [kʷ], which has only a single stop articulation, velar [k], with a simultaneous approximant-like rounding of the lips.

There is a large number of common secondary articulations. The most frequently encountered are:

- labialization (such as [kʷ] in many languages)
- palatalization (such as "soft" consonants in Slavic languages, like [pʲ] in Russian)
- velarization (such as "dark" l [lˠ] in many languages, including English)
- pharyngealization (such as "emphatic" consonants in Semitic languages, like [tˤ] in Arabic)

== Distinction between the two classes ==
As might be expected from the approximant-like nature of secondary articulation, it is not always easy to tell whether a co-articulated approximant such as /w/ is doubly or secondarily articulated. In some English dialects, for example, /w/ is a labialized velar that could be transcribed as [ɰʷ].

== Similar phones ==
The glottis controls phonation, and works simultaneously with many consonants. It is not normally considered an articulator, and an ejective such as [kʼ], with simultaneous closure of the velum and glottis, is not normally considered to be a co-articulated consonant.

== See also ==
- List of phonetics topics
- Gemination
- Voiceless labial–palatal fricative

Place →	Labial					Coronal										Dorsal					Laryngeal			
Manner ↓	Bilabial		Labiodental		Linguolabial		Dental		Alveolar		Postalveolar		Retroflex		(Alveolo-)palatal		Velar		Uvular		Pharyngeal/epiglottal		Glottal	
Nasal	m̥	m	ɱ̊	ɱ		n̼	n̪̊	n̪	n̥	n	n̠̊	n̠	ɳ̊	ɳ	ɲ̊	ɲ	ŋ̊	ŋ	ɴ̥	ɴ				
Plosive	p	b	p̪	b̪	t̼	d̼	t̪	d̪	t	d			ʈ	ɖ	c	ɟ	k	ɡ	q	ɢ	ʡ		ʔ	
Sibilant affricate							t̪s̪	d̪z̪	ts	dz	t̠ʃ	d̠ʒ	tʂ	dʐ	tɕ	dʑ								
Non-sibilant affricate	pɸ	bβ	p̪f	b̪v			t̪θ	d̪ð	tɹ̝̊	dɹ̝	t̠ɹ̠̊˔	d̠ɹ̠˔			cç	ɟʝ	kx	ɡɣ	qχ	ɢʁ	ʡʜ	ʡʢ	ʔh	
Sibilant fricative							s̪	z̪	s	z	ʃ	ʒ	ʂ	ʐ	ɕ	ʑ								
Non-sibilant fricative	ɸ	β	f	v	θ̼	ð̼	θ	ð	θ̠	ð̠	ɹ̠̊˔	ɹ̠˔	ɻ̊˔	ɻ˔	ç	ʝ	x	ɣ	χ	ʁ	ħ	ʕ	h	ɦ
Approximant		β̞		ʋ				ð̞		ɹ		ɹ̠		ɻ		j		ɰ						˷
Tap/flap		ⱱ̟		ⱱ					ɾ̥	ɾ			ɽ̊	ɽ						ɢ̆		ʡ̮		
Trill	ʙ̥	ʙ							r̥	r		r̠	ɽ̊r̥	ɽr					ʀ̥	ʀ	ʜ	ʢ		
Lateral affricate									tɬ	dɮ			tꞎ	d𝼅	c𝼆	ɟʎ̝	k𝼄	ɡʟ̝						
Lateral fricative							ɬ̪		ɬ	ɮ			ꞎ	𝼅	𝼆	ʎ̝	𝼄	ʟ̝						
Lateral approximant								l̪	l̥	l		l̠	ɭ̊	ɭ	ʎ̥	ʎ	ʟ̥	ʟ		ʟ̠				
Lateral tap/flap									ɺ̥	ɺ			𝼈̊	𝼈		ʎ̮		ʟ̆						

		BL	LD	D	A	PA	RF	P	V	U
Implosive	Voiced	ɓ			ɗ		ᶑ	ʄ	ɠ	ʛ
Implosive	Voiceless	ɓ̥			ɗ̥		ᶑ̊	ʄ̊	ɠ̊	ʛ̥
Ejective	Stop	pʼ			tʼ		ʈʼ	cʼ	kʼ	qʼ
Ejective	Affricate		p̪fʼ	t̪θʼ	tsʼ	t̠ʃʼ	tʂʼ	tɕʼ	kxʼ	qχʼ
Ejective	Fricative	ɸʼ	fʼ	θʼ	sʼ	ʃʼ	ʂʼ	ɕʼ	xʼ	χʼ
Ejective	Lateral affricate				tɬʼ			c𝼆ʼ	k𝼄ʼ	q𝼄ʼ
Ejective	Lateral fricative				ɬʼ					
Click (top: velar; bottom: uvular)	Tenuis	kʘ qʘ		kǀ qǀ	kǃ qǃ		k𝼊 q𝼊	kǂ qǂ		
Click (top: velar; bottom: uvular)	Voiced	ɡʘ ɢʘ		ɡǀ ɢǀ	ɡǃ ɢǃ		ɡ𝼊 ɢ𝼊	ɡǂ ɢǂ		
Click (top: velar; bottom: uvular)	Nasal	ŋʘ ɴʘ		ŋǀ ɴǀ	ŋǃ ɴǃ		ŋ𝼊 ɴ𝼊	ŋǂ ɴǂ	ʞ	
Click (top: velar; bottom: uvular)	Tenuis lateral				kǁ qǁ					
Click (top: velar; bottom: uvular)	Voiced lateral				ɡǁ ɢǁ					
Click (top: velar; bottom: uvular)	Nasal lateral				ŋǁ ɴǁ					
