= Labialized velar consonant =

Velar consonant that is labialized

A labialized velar or labiovelar is a velar consonant that is labialized, with a /w/-like secondary articulation. Examples are [kʷ, ɡʷ, xʷ, ɣʷ, ŋʷ], which are pronounced like a [k, ɡ, x, ɣ, ŋ], with rounded lips, such as the labialized voiceless velar plosive [kʷ] and labialized voiced velar plosive [ɡʷ], obstruents being common among the sounds that undergo labialization.

== Labialized velar continuants ==
The most common labiovelar consonant is the voiced approximant [w]. It is normally a labialized velar, as is its vocalic equivalent [u]. (Labialization is called rounding in vowels, and a velar place is called back).

[w] and its voiceless equivalent are the only labialized velars with dedicated IPA symbols:

IPA	Description	Example			
IPA	Description	Language	Orthography	IPA	Meaning
ʍ	Voiceless labial–velar fricative	English	which	[ʍɪtʃ] (Note: In dialects that distinguish between which and witch; see Pronunciation of English ⟨wh⟩.)	'which'
w	Voiced labial–velar approximant	English	witch	[wɪtʃ]	'witch'

== Historical development ==
Labialized velars frequently derive from a plain velar followed by a rounded (labialized) vowel, such as [u] or [o]. In turn, they may sometimes develop into simple bilabial consonants. An example of this is the development of Proto-Indo-European *kʷ, *gʷ before *a or *o into Greek /p, b/, producing cognates as different as English come and basis. The full sequence is demonstrated by the Satsuma dialect of Japanese: in northern Satsuma, Standard Japanese [kue] 'eat!' has contracted to [kʷe]; in southern Satsuma, it has proceeded further to [pe].

A notable development is the initial *kʷ in Proto-Indo-European interrogative words. In English, it developed into wh or h (how), pronounced /w/ in most dialects and /h/, respectively, via Grimm's law followed by wh-cluster reductions. By contrast, in Latin and its descendants, the Romance languages, that developed into qu (later Spanish cu (cuando) and c (como)), pronounced as /kʷ/ in Latin and variously as /kw/ or /k/ in the Romance languages. See etymology of English interrogative words for details. The English phonemic spelling kw for qu (as in kwik) echoes its origin.

== See also ==
- Co-articulated consonant
- Doubly articulated consonant
- Voiced bilabial fricative
- Voiceless bilabial fricative
