= Voiced labial–velar nasal =

Consonantal sound

ŋm
- IPA number: 119 (114)

Audio sample
- source · help

Encoding
- Entity (decimal): &#331;&#865;&#109;
- Unicode (hex): U+014B U+0361 U+006D
- X-SAMPA: Nm
Image

A voiced labial–velar nasal is a type of consonantal sound, used in some spoken languages. The symbol in the International Phonetic Alphabet that represents this sound is ⟨ŋ͡m⟩.

A labial–velar nasal is found in West and Central Africa and eastern New Guinea, as well as in certain contexts in Vietnamese.

== Features ==
Features of a voiced labial–velar nasal:

- Its manner of articulation is occlusive, which means it is produced by obstructing airflow in the vocal tract. Because the consonant is also nasal, the blocked airflow is redirected through the nose.
- Its place of articulation is labial–velar, which means it is simultaneously articulated with the lips and with the back part of the tongue (the dorsum) against the soft palate (the velum). The dorsal closure is made and released slightly before the labial closure, but they overlap for most of their duration.
- Its phonation is voiced, which means the vocal cords vibrate during the articulation.
- It is a nasal consonant, which means air is exclusively allowed to escape through the nose for nasal stops; otherwise, in addition to through the mouth.
- It is a median consonant, which means it is produced by directing the airstream down the midline of the tongue, rather than to the sides.
- Its airstream mechanism is pulmonic, which means it is articulated by pushing air only with the intercostal muscles and abdominal muscles, as in most speech sounds.

== Occurrence ==
Language	Word	IPA	Meaning	Notes
Dangme	Dangme	[daŋ͡me]	'Dangme'	
Igala	ñmọ	[ŋ͡mɔ̃]	'to drink'	Allophone of /m/. See Igala Phonology
Vietnamese	đúng	[ɗuŋ͡m]	'correct'	Allophone of /ŋ/ after /u, o, ɔ/. See Vietnamese phonology
Yele	ngmo	[ŋ͡mɔ]	'breast'	Contrasts voiced labial–alveolar nasal and voiced labial–retroflex nasal.

== Labialized variant ==
Some languages, especially in Vanuatu, combine this labial–velar nasal with a labial–velar approximant release, hence [ŋ͡mʷ].

In the Banks Islands languages which have it, the phoneme /ŋ͡mʷ/ is written ⟨m̄⟩ in local orthographies, using a macron on the corresponding bilabial. In other languages of Vanuatu further south (such as South Efate, or Lenakel), the same segment is spelled ⟨m̃⟩ with a combining tilde.

Language	Word	IPA	Meaning	Notes
Dorig	m̄sar	[ŋ͡mʷsar]	'poor'	Realized with an approximant release.
Gua	ŋmʷɛ	[ŋmʷɛ]	'life'/'thank'	Realized with an approximant release.
Lakon	um̄ä	[uŋ͡mʷæ]	'house'	Realized with an approximant release.
Lenakel	noanəm̃ɨk	[noanəŋ͡mʷɨk]	'egg yolk'	Realized with an approximant release.
Mwesen	tam̄sar	[taŋ͡mʷsar]	'person'	Realized with an approximant release.

== See also ==
- List of phonetics topics
- Doubly articulated consonant

== Notes ==
Place →	Labial					Coronal										Dorsal					Laryngeal			
Manner ↓	Bilabial		Labiodental		Linguolabial		Dental		Alveolar		Postalveolar		Retroflex		(Alveolo-)palatal		Velar		Uvular		Pharyngeal/epiglottal		Glottal	
Nasal	m̥	m	ɱ̊	ɱ		n̼	n̪̊	n̪	n̥	n	n̠̊	n̠	ɳ̊	ɳ	ɲ̊	ɲ	ŋ̊	ŋ	ɴ̥	ɴ				
Plosive	p	b	p̪	b̪	t̼	d̼	t̪	d̪	t	d			ʈ	ɖ	c	ɟ	k	ɡ	q	ɢ	ʡ		ʔ	
Sibilant affricate							ts̪	dz̪	ts	dz	tʃ	dʒ	tʂ	dʐ	tɕ	dʑ								
Non-sibilant affricate	pɸ	bβ	p̪f	b̪v			tθ	dð	tɹ̝̊	dɹ̝	t̠ɹ̝̊	d̠ɹ̝			cç	ɟʝ	kx	ɡɣ	qχ	ɢʁ	ʡʜ	ʡʢ	ʔh	
Sibilant fricative							s̪	z̪	s	z	ʃ	ʒ	ʂ	ʐ	ɕ	ʑ								
Non-sibilant fricative	ɸ	β	f	v	θ̼	ð̼	θ	ð	θ̠	ð̠	ɹ̝̠̊	ɹ̠᷵	ɻ̥᷵	ɻ᷵	ç	ʝ	x	ɣ	χ	ʁ	ħ	ʕ	h	ɦ
Approximant		β̞		ʋ				ð̞		ɹ		ɹ̠		ɻ		j		ɰ						˷
Tap/flap		ⱱ̟		ⱱ					ɾ̥	ɾ			ɽ̊	ɽ						ɢ̆		ʡ̮		
Trill	ʙ̥	ʙ							r̥	r		r̠	ɽ̊r̥	ɽr					ʀ̥	ʀ	ʜ	ʢ		
Lateral affricate									tɬ	dɮ			tꞎ	d𝼅	c𝼆	ɟʎ̝	k𝼄	ɡʟ̝						
Lateral fricative							ɬ̪		ɬ	ɮ			ꞎ	𝼅	𝼆	ʎ̝	𝼄	ʟ̝						
Lateral approximant								l̪	l̥	l		l̠	ɭ̊	ɭ	ʎ̥	ʎ	ʟ̥	ʟ		ʟ̠				
Lateral tap/flap									ɺ̥	ɺ			𝼈̊	𝼈		ʎ̮		ʟ̆						

		BL	LD	D	A	PA	RF	P	V	U
Implosive	Voiced	ɓ			ɗ		ᶑ	ʄ	ɠ	ʛ
Implosive	Voiceless	ɓ̥			ɗ̥		ᶑ̊	ʄ̊	ɠ̊	ʛ̥
Ejective	Stop	pʼ			tʼ		ʈʼ	cʼ	kʼ	qʼ
Ejective	Affricate		p̪fʼ	tθʼ	tsʼ	tʃʼ	tʂʼ	tɕʼ	kxʼ	qχʼ
Ejective	Fricative	ɸʼ	fʼ	θʼ	sʼ	ʃʼ	ʂʼ	ɕʼ	xʼ	χʼ
Ejective	Lateral affricate				tɬʼ			c𝼆ʼ	k𝼄ʼ	q𝼄ʼ
Ejective	Lateral fricative				ɬʼ					
Click (top: velar; bottom: uvular)	Tenuis	kʘ qʘ		kǀ qǀ	kǃ qǃ		k𝼊 q𝼊	kǂ qǂ		
Click (top: velar; bottom: uvular)	Voiced	ɡʘ ɢʘ		ɡǀ ɢǀ	ɡǃ ɢǃ		ɡ𝼊 ɢ𝼊	ɡǂ ɢǂ		
Click (top: velar; bottom: uvular)	Nasal	ŋʘ ɴʘ		ŋǀ ɴǀ	ŋǃ ɴǃ		ŋ𝼊 ɴ𝼊	ŋǂ ɴǂ	ʞ	
Click (top: velar; bottom: uvular)	Tenuis lateral				kǁ qǁ					
Click (top: velar; bottom: uvular)	Voiced lateral				ɡǁ ɢǁ					
Click (top: velar; bottom: uvular)	Nasal lateral				ŋǁ ɴǁ					
