= Dento-alveolar =

Dento-alveolar may refer to:

- The alveolar process, the ridge of bone that contains dental alveolus
- A dento-alveolar consonant, a consonant that is articulated with a flat tongue against the alveolar ridge and upper teeth
