= Labial–coronal consonant =

Type of doubly articulated consonant

A labial–coronal consonant is a consonant produced with two simultaneous articulators: with the lips ('labial'; a [p], [b], or [m] sound), and with the tongue (at the teeth or gums, a 'dental' or 'alveolar' [t], [d] or [n] sound, or further back, a 'post-alveolar' or 'retroflex' [ʈ], [ɖ] or [ɳ] sound).

Several languages have been claimed to have such sounds, such as Margi and Bura in Nigeria. However, most researchers interpret them as having sequences of labial and coronal consonants, a rather common occurrence in Africa. The Yélî Dnye language of Rossel Island, Papua New Guinea, appears to be unique in having distinct laminal labial–alveolar (i.e. labial–denti-alveolar) and labial–retroflex (i.e. apical to sub-apical labial–postalveolar) places of articulation, as illustrated below.

Stops in Yelî Dnye	Bilabial		Alveolar		Retroflex		Velar	
Stop	paa	side	t̪aa	knife	ʈoo	tongue	kaa	spear
Prenasalized stop	mbee	carry	n̪d̪e	food	ɳɖe	firewood	ŋɡaa	tree
Nasal	maa	road	n̪ii	juice	ɳaa	feast	ŋa	lease

Stops in Yelî Dnye	Labial–alveolar		Labial–retroflex		Labial–velar	
Stop	t̪͡pənə	lung	ʈ͡pənə	horn	k͡pene	coconut bag
Prenasalized stop	n͡md̪͡boo	pulp	ɳ͡mɖ͡boo	many	ŋ͡mɡ͡bo	fog
Nasal	n̪͡mo	bird	ɳ͡mo	we	ŋ͡mo	breast

== Types ==
=== Labial–alveolar ===
Labial–alveolar consonants are doubly articulated consonants that are co-articulated at the lips and the front part of the tongue against the alveolar ridge or the alveolar ridge and the teeth. They are only well-attested in Yelî Dnye.

Several labial–alveolar consonants are attested in Yelî Dnye, where the alveolar contact is more precisely denti-alveolar: a voiceless plosive /t̪͡p/, a nasal /n̪͡m/, and prenasalized /ⁿd̪͡b/ (also analyzed as /ⁿt̪͡p/ but phonetically voiced), of which /t̪͡pʲ/ and /ⁿd̪͡bʲ/ may also occur palatalized.

=== Labial–postalveolar ===
Labial–postalveolar consonants are doubly articulated consonants that are co-articulated at the lips and the postalveolar plate. They are only attested in some dialects of Sotho–Tswana languages, such as Setswana, Sesotho, and Northern Sotho.

Several labial–postalveolar consonants are attested in Setswana, including a voiceless fricative [ɸ͡ʃ] and voiceless affricate [p͡ʃ], aspirated affricate [p͡ʃʰ], and voiced affricate [b͡ʒ]. However, there is debate as to whether they are truly doubly articulated, and may in fact be more similar to labialized postalveolars, in which case [ɸ͡ʃ] would be reanalyzed as [ʃᶲ].

=== Labial–retroflex ===
Labial–retroflex consonants are doubly articulated consonants that are co-articulated at the lips and with the front part or underside of the tongue against the palate. They are only well-attested in Yelî Dnye.

Several labial–retroflex consonants are attested in Yelî Dnye. These include a voiceless plosive /ʈ͡p/, an allophonic voiced plosive /ɖ͡b/, a nasal /ɳ͡m/, prenasalized /ɳ͡mɖ͡b/ (also analyzed as /ɳ͡mʈ͡p/ but phonetically voiced), and postnasalized /ʈ͡pɳ͡m/, all or most of which may also occur palatalized: /ʈ͡pʲ/, /ɳ͡mʲ/, /ʈ͡pɳ͡mʲ/ and possibly /ɳ͡mɖ͡bʲ/ and /ɖ͡bʲ/. [ʈ͡pɳ͡mɖ͡b͡ɭ] also appears in it. Yelî Dnye is unique in having this series of consonants.

== Labial–coronal allophones ==
In some Ghanaian languages such as Dagbani, and Nzema, there are palatalized allophones of labial–velars. These are sometimes mistakenly referred to as labial–alveolars, though they actually have a post-alveolar or palatal articulation instead of a true alveolar one.

Something similar is found with the labialized alveolar stops in several Northwest and Northeast Caucasian languages such as Abkhaz and Lak. Although the double stop articulation may be more common, they are generally considered to be essentially labialized alveolars because the labial contact is light, and moreover the contact is between the inner surfaces of the lips, which are protruded as they are for [w]. This is quite different from the normal contact for [p] in these languages. The labial contact may also be realized as a trill. Compare the following minimal sets in Ubykh:

da	now	dʷa ~ d͡ba ~ d͡ʙa	awl	ba	if
ta	pregnant	tʷa ~ t͡pa ~ t͡ʙ̥a	cherry	pa	to weave
tʼə	ram	tʷʼə ~ t͡pʼə ~ t͡ʙ̥ʼə	to take out		

Some speakers of !Xóõ have a labial–dental allophone, [ʘ͡ǀ] (or [ɋ͡ʇ]), of the bilabial click /ʘ/ in some cases (Traill 1985: 103–104).

Discounting clicks otherwise as having a velar/lingual airstream mechanism rather than a double articulation, nearly all other doubly articulated consonants in the world are labial–velars. The labial-alveolars reported from some Chadic languages have upon investigation turned out to be /tp/, /db/, /nm/ and /dɓ/ sequences, not single consonants. (See Margi language.)

== Bibliography ==
Ladefoged, Peter; Maddieson, Ian (1996). The Sounds of the World's Languages. Oxford: Blackwell. ISBN 0-631-19815-6.
