= Yele – West New Britain languages =

Proposed language family

Yele – West New Britain
- (proposed)
- Geographic distribution: New Britain & Rossel Island
- Linguistic classification: Proposed language family
- Subdivisions: West New Britain; ? Yélî Dnye

Language codes
- Glottolog: None

Yele – West New Britain is a tentative language family proposal by Malcolm Ross that unites three languages: Anêm and Ata (Wasi) of western New Britain, and more dubiously Yélî Dnye (Yele) of Rossel Island. These were classified as East Papuan languages by Stephen Wurm, but this does not now seem tenable.

== Pronouns ==
The evidence for the Yele – West New Britain family comes from the pronouns. Each language has two distinct sets of pronouns, and both sets correspond across the three languages. The forms illustrated here are the free pronouns and subject prefixes of Anêm and Ata, and the free and possessive/prepositional pronouns of Yele. Anêm and Ata make a distinction between inclusive and exclusive we. Yele also has dual pronouns which are not shown.

Anêm
I	ue, a-	excl.	mɯn, mɯ-
I	ue, a-	incl.	miŋ, –
thou	nin, ni-	you	–, ŋɯ-
he	lɤxa, u-	they	–, i-
she	sɤxa, i-	they	–, i-

Ata
I	eni, a-	excl.	neɣi, ta-
I	eni, a-	incl.	ŋeŋe, –
thou	nini, na-	you	ŋiŋi, ŋa-
he	anu, u-	they	aneʔi, i-
she	ani, i-	they	aneʔi, i-

Yele
I	ɳə, a	we	ɳ͡mo, ɳ͡mɨ
thou	ni, N-	you	n͡mo, n͡me
s/he	–, u	they	–, ji

== See also ==
- Papuan languages
