= Anêm language =

Papuan language

Anêm
- Pronunciation: [anɤm]
- Native to: Papua New Guinea
- Region: West New Britain Province
- Native speakers: 800 (2011)
- Language family: West New Britain?: Anêm

Language codes
- ISO 639-3: anz
- Glottolog: anem1249
- ELP: Anem

The Anêm language is a Papuan language spoken in five main villages along the northwestern coast of New Britain, Papua New Guinea.

== External relationships ==
Anêm may be related to neighboring Ata and possibly to Yélî Dnye. Stebbins et al. state that further data on Anêm and Ata would be useful for exploring the possible connection between them.

== Demographics ==
Anêm is spoken in the following villages of West New Britain Province:

- Malasoŋo (5.528393°S 148.809235°E) (where it is spoken alongside Bariai)
- Karaiai (5.45988°S 148.979°E)
- Mosiliki (5.47614°S 149.017°E)
- Pudêlîŋ (5.49295°S 149.043°E)
- Atiatu (5.49019°S 149.069°E) (where it is spoken alongside Lusi)
- Bolo (5.58685°S 149.182°E) (where it is spoken alongside a version of Aria)

All of the villages above are located in Kove-Kaliai Rural LLG of West New Britain Province, except for Malasoŋo, which is located in Gurrissi ward of Gloucester Rural LLG, West New Britain Province.

Anêm is also spoken by small numbers of people, mostly of Anêm descent, scattered among the surrounding villages. There are two main dialects.

Akiblîk, the dialect of Bolo, was near functional extinction in 1982, the youngest speaker then being about 35 years old. The main dialect is spoken in the other villages named above. There are about 800 speakers.

== Phonology ==
Consonants
| | | Labial | Alveolar | Palatal / Velar |
|---|---|---|---|---|
| Nasal | | m | n | ŋ ⟨ng⟩ |
| Plosive | Voiceless | p | t | k |
| Plosive | Voiced | b | d | ɡ |
| Trill | | | r | |
| Fricative | | β ⟨v⟩ | s | x~ɣ ⟨x⟩* |
| Approximant | | | l | j ⟨y⟩ |

⟨x⟩ is listed as a post-velar trill in Thurston (1982), but as a velar fricative in Stebbins (2018).

Vowels
| | Front | Central | Back | |
| | Front | Central | Unrounded | Rounded |
|---|---|---|---|---|
| High | i | | ɯ ⟨î⟩ | u |
| Mid | e | | ɤ ⟨ê⟩ | o |
| Low | | a | | |

== Grammar ==
Anêm is notable for having at least 20 possessive classes.

=== Syntax ===
Anêm is an accusative language with unmarked subject–verb–object word order in plain statements. Yes/no questions are indicated with an intonation contour rather than alterations in word order. Negation (not, not yet, don't) and completive aspect (already) are indicated by modality markers which occur in clause-final position. Tense is not indicated directly. There are three distinctions of mood (realis, irrealis and hortative). Realis refers to something that has happened or is happening; irrealis refers to future tense and hypotheticals; and hortative (only in third persons) is used in commands.

- Transitive clauses showing subject–verb–object order:

Tita-nae u-b-î aba niak.
father-my REAL.he-kill-them pig two
'My father killed two pigs.'

Aia-nae i-sama-dî uas.
mother-my REAL.she-seek-it tobacco
'My mother is looking for some tobacco.'

- Negative markers are clause final:

U-k a-xî nan?
REAL.he-go to-it garden
'Did he go to the garden?'

U-k a-xî nan mantu.
REAL.he-go to-it garden not
'He didn't go to the garden.'

U-k a-xî nan pmaga.
REAL.he-go to-it garden not.yet
'He hasn't gone to the garden yet.'

Na-k a-xî nan êbêl.
REAL.you-go to-it garden don't
'Don't go to the garden.'

- Hortative mood:

o-k a-xî nan!
HORT.he-go to-it garden
"Let him go to the garden!'

=== Nouns ===
Anêm nouns are distinguished syntactically for gender, masculine or feminine. Masculine nouns are followed by demonstratives or relative pronouns that begin with /l/ while feminine nouns are followed by demonstratives or relative pronouns that begin with /s/. In addition, both subject prefixes and some object suffixes agree in gender with the noun they refer to:

- Masculine and feminine gender forms of demonstratives:

Doxa lê u-ko-lo.
person the.M REAL.he-see-him
'The man saw him.'

Doxa sê i-ko-lo.
person the.F REAL.she-see-him.
'The woman saw him.'

- Gender agreement by subject prefix and object suffix:

Onu lê i-kê-lêm.
people the.M REAL.they-see-her.
'The people saw her.'

There are 20 possession classes in Anêm. Meanings vary depending on the assigned noun class, as shown in the examples below, with ki ‘hair’ as the noun root.

- ki-l-e ‘my hair (head)’
- ki-ŋ-e ‘my hair (pubic)’
- ki-g-a ‘my hair (body)’

== Vocabulary ==
100-word Swadesh list of Anêm:

| gloss | Anêm |
|---|---|
| I | ue |
| you (sg.) | nin |
| we | miŋ / mîn |
| this (masc.) | ler |
| this (fem.) | ser |
| that (masc.) | lan |
| that (fem.) | san |
| who? | mên |
| what? | gîmên |
| not | mantu |
| all | buno |
| many | buno |
| one | mîdê |
| two | niak |
| big | omba |
| long | sêgêl |
| small | boid |
| woman | dobalîŋ |
| man | axaŋ |
| person | doxam |
| fish | ia |
| bird | êknîn |
| dog | kaua |
| louse | seim |
| tree | aŋ |
| seed | lali |
| leaf | ki |
| root | zilŋon |
| bark | palau |
| skin | palau |
| flesh | be |
| blood | esin |
| bone | exe |
| grease | êmzêk |
| egg | nil |
| horn | |
| tail | taba |
| feather | ki |
| hair | ki |
| head | og |
| ear | gêt |
| eye | ei |
| nose | piŋi |
| mouth | boŋ |
| tooth | lo |
| tongue | êlêŋ |
| claw | gi |
| foot | ti |
| knee | bol |
| hand | tîm |
| belly | êtêl |
| neck | agîm |
| breasts | i |
| heart | dokam |
| liver | êl |
| drink | -ik |
| eat | |
| bite | -ŋai |
| see | -kê |
| hear | -degiŋ |
| know | -pun |
| sleep | -sêm / -tel |
| die | -zik / -lkîl |
| kill | -b / -pel |
| swim | -us |
| fly | -iê |
| walk | -li |
| come | -mên |
| lie | -sêm / -tel |
| sit | -sîk / -sîl |
| stand | -lîk / -lul |
| give | -sn |
| say | -ual |
| sun | ado |
| moon | klîŋ |
| star | eilî |
| water | komu |
| rain | iuo |
| stone | pa |
| sand | iabu |
| earth | eidî |
| cloud | olok |
| smoke | bîl |
| fire | kmî |
| ash | goxub |
| burn | -pma |
| path | iuŋ |
| mountain | êbêt |
| red | êxiêk |
| green / blue | biê |
| yellow | iaŋo |
| white | iagu |
| black | kŋîx |
| night | nib |
| hot | êŋîl |
| cold | epen |
| full | êpêx |
| new | masîk |
| good | leim |
| round | puax |
| dry | pît |
| name | eŋi |

== See also ==
- East Papuan languages
