= Labial–velar consonant =

Consonant that is doubly articulated at the soft palate and the lips

Labial–velar consonants are doubly articulated at the velum and the lips, such as [k͡p]. They are sometimes called "labiovelar consonants", a term that can also refer to labialized velars, such as the stop consonant [kʷ] and the approximant [w].

In languages that use Latin scripts, labial–velars are often written with digraphs, but not always. In the Kâte language, for example, /k͡p/ is written with ⟨Q q⟩, and /ɡ͡b/ with ⟨Ɋ ɋ⟩.

Globally, these types of consonants are quite rare, primarily existing in two regions: West to Central Africa and Eastern New Guinea to northern Vanuatu. There are two other isolated cases, allophonically in Vietnamese and in the Adu dialect of Nuosu Yi.

== Plain labial–velar stops ==
Truly doubly articulated labial-velars include the stops [k͡p, ɡ͡b], the nasal [ŋ͡m], and the implosive [ɠ͜ɓ]. To pronounce them, one must attempt to say the velar consonants but then close their lips for the bilabial component, and then release the lips. While 90% of the occlusion overlaps, the onset of the velar occurs slightly before that of the labial, and the release of the labial occurs slightly after that of the velar so the preceding vowel sounds as if it were followed by a velar, and the following vowel sounds as if it were preceded by a labial. The order of the letters in ⟨k͡p⟩ and ⟨ɡ͡b⟩ is therefore not arbitrary but motivated by the phonetic details of the sounds.

Phonemic labial–velars occur in the majority of languages in West and Central Africa (for example in the name of Laurent Gbagbo, former president of Ivory Coast; they are found in many Niger–Congo languages as well as in the Ubangian, Chadic and Central Sudanic families), and are relatively common in the eastern end of New Guinea. The rare implosive is only found in Lese, a Nilo-Saharan language of the Democratic Republic of the Congo. In Southeast Asia, they occur in the Adu dialect of Nuosu (Yi), which aside from its isolated location, is unusual in having a relatively large inventory of labial-velar consonants, including the rare aspirated version: /k͡pʰ, k͡p, ɡ͡b, ᵑɡ͡b, ŋ͡m/.

Labial–velar stops can also occur as an ejective [k͡pʼ] (unattested) and a voiceless implosive [ƙ͜ƥ]. Floyd (1981) and Clark (1990) report that voiced and voiceless implosives /ɠ͡ɓ, ƙ͜ƥ/ occur in Central Igbo. As stated above, the voiced implosive has been confirmed in Lese.

The Yele language of Rossel Island, Papua New Guinea, has both labial–velars and labial–alveolar consonants. Labial–velar stops and nasals also occur in Vietnamese but only word-finally.

IPA	Description	Example			
IPA	Description	Language	Orthography	IPA	Meaning
k͡p	voiceless labial–velar stop	Logba	ò-kpàyɔ̀	[òk͡pàjɔ̀]	'God'
ɡ͡b	voiced labial–velar stop	Ewe	Èʋegbe	[èβeɡ͡be]	'the Ewe language'
ɠ̊͜ɓ̥	voiceless labial–velar implosive	Central Igbo	kpọ́	[ɠ̊͜ɓ̥ɔ́]	'call'
ɠ͡ɓ	voiced labial–velar implosive	Lese	[eɠ͡ɓe]		'in'
ŋ͡m	labial-velar nasal	Vietnamese	cung	[kuŋ͡m]	'sector'
ᵑ͡ᵐɡ͡b	prenasalized voiced labial–velar stop	Nen	dénḡ	[dɪᵑ͡ᵐɡ͡b]	'old-style bamboo pipe or container'

These phonemes are single consonants rather than consonant clusters. For example, Eggon contrasts /bɡ/, /ɡb/, and /ɡ͡b/. The following possibilities are possible if tone is ignored:

Single consonant		Two-consonant sequence	
pom	'to pound'	kba	'to dig'
abu	'a dog'	bɡa	'to beat, to kill'
aku	'a room'	ak͡pki	'a stomach'
ɡom	'to break'	ɡ͡bɡa	'to grind'
k͡pu	'to die'	kpu	'to kneel'
ɡ͡bu	'to arrive'	ɡba	'to divide'

Allophonic labial-velars are known from Vietnamese, where they are variants of the plain velar consonants /k/ and /ŋ/.

== Labialized labial–velars ==
Some languages, especially in Papua New Guinea and in Vanuatu, combine the labial–velar consonants with a labial–velar approximant release: [k͡pʷ], [ŋ͡mʷ]. The extinct language Volow had a prenasalised labial–velar stop with labialization [ᵑ͡ᵐɡ͡bʷ].

IPA	Description	Example			
IPA	Description	Language	Orthography	IPA	Meaning
k͡pʷ	voiceless labial–velar stop with labialization	Dorig	rqa	[rk͡pʷa]	'woman'
ŋ͡mʷ	labial-velar nasal with labialization	Mwesen	ēm̄	[ɪŋ͡mʷ]	'house'
ᵑ͡ᵐɡ͡bʷ	prenasalized voiced labial–velar stop with labialization	Volow	n-leq̄evēn	[nlɛᵑᵐɡ͡bʷɛβɪn]	'woman'

== Velar labial clicks ==
Bilabial clicks are stops that involve closure at both the lips and the soft palate. Treatments often analyze the dorsal articulation as part of the airstream mechanism, and so consider such stops to be labial. However, there may be a distinction between the velar labial clicks [k͡ʘ ɡ͡ʘ ŋ͡ʘ] and the uvular labial clicks [q͡ʘ ɢ͡ʘ ɴ͡ʘ], which is not captured if they are described as simply labial.

== See also ==
- Place of articulation
- List of phonetics topics

== Notes ==
Place →	Labial					Coronal										Dorsal					Laryngeal			
Manner ↓	Bilabial		Labiodental		Linguolabial		Dental		Alveolar		Postalveolar		Retroflex		(Alveolo-)palatal		Velar		Uvular		Pharyngeal/epiglottal		Glottal	
Nasal	m̥	m	ɱ̊	ɱ		n̼	n̪̊	n̪	n̥	n	n̠̊	n̠	ɳ̊	ɳ	ɲ̊	ɲ	ŋ̊	ŋ	ɴ̥	ɴ				
Plosive	p	b	p̪	b̪	t̼	d̼	t̪	d̪	t	d			ʈ	ɖ	c	ɟ	k	ɡ	q	ɢ	ʡ		ʔ	
Sibilant affricate							t̪s̪	d̪z̪	ts	dz	t̠ʃ	d̠ʒ	tʂ	dʐ	tɕ	dʑ								
Non-sibilant affricate	pɸ	bβ	p̪f	b̪v			t̪θ	d̪ð	tɹ̝̊	dɹ̝	t̠ɹ̠̊˔	d̠ɹ̠˔			cç	ɟʝ	kx	ɡɣ	qχ	ɢʁ	ʡʜ	ʡʢ	ʔh	
Sibilant fricative							s̪	z̪	s	z	ʃ	ʒ	ʂ	ʐ	ɕ	ʑ								
Non-sibilant fricative	ɸ	β	f	v	θ̼	ð̼	θ	ð	θ̠	ð̠	ɹ̠̊˔	ɹ̠˔	ɻ̊˔	ɻ˔	ç	ʝ	x	ɣ	χ	ʁ	ħ	ʕ	h	ɦ
Approximant		β̞		ʋ				ð̞		ɹ		ɹ̠		ɻ		j		ɰ						˷
Tap/flap		ⱱ̟		ⱱ					ɾ̥	ɾ			ɽ̊	ɽ						ɢ̆		ʡ̆		
Trill	ʙ̥	ʙ							r̥	r		r̠	ɽ̊r̥	ɽr					ʀ̥	ʀ	ʜ	ʢ		
Lateral affricate									tɬ	dɮ			tꞎ	d𝼅	c𝼆	ɟʎ̝	k𝼄	ɡʟ̝						
Lateral fricative							ɬ̪		ɬ	ɮ			ꞎ	𝼅	𝼆	ʎ̝	𝼄	ʟ̝						
Lateral approximant								l̪	l̥	l		l̠	ɭ̊	ɭ	ʎ̥	ʎ	ʟ̥	ʟ		ʟ̠				
Lateral tap/flap									ɺ̥	ɺ			𝼈̊	𝼈		ʎ̆		ʟ̆						

		BL	LD	D	A	PA	RF	P	V	U
Implosive	Voiced	ɓ			ɗ		ᶑ	ʄ	ɠ	ʛ
Implosive	Voiceless	ɓ̥			ɗ̥		ᶑ̊	ʄ̊	ɠ̊	ʛ̥
Ejective	Stop	pʼ			tʼ		ʈʼ	cʼ	kʼ	qʼ
Ejective	Affricate		p̪fʼ	tθʼ	tsʼ	tʃʼ	tʂʼ	tɕʼ	kxʼ	qχʼ
Ejective	Fricative	ɸʼ	fʼ	θʼ	sʼ	ʃʼ	ʂʼ	ɕʼ	xʼ	χʼ
Ejective	Lateral affricate				tɬʼ			c𝼆ʼ	k𝼄ʼ	q𝼄ʼ
Ejective	Lateral fricative				ɬʼ					
Click (top: velar; bottom: uvular)	Tenuis	kʘ qʘ		kǀ qǀ	kǃ qǃ		k𝼊 q𝼊	kǂ qǂ		
Click (top: velar; bottom: uvular)	Voiced	ɡʘ ɢʘ		ɡǀ ɢǀ	ɡǃ ɢǃ		ɡ𝼊 ɢ𝼊	ɡǂ ɢǂ		
Click (top: velar; bottom: uvular)	Nasal	ŋʘ ɴʘ		ŋǀ ɴǀ	ŋǃ ɴǃ		ŋ𝼊 ɴ𝼊	ŋǂ ɴǂ	ʞ	
Click (top: velar; bottom: uvular)	Tenuis lateral				kǁ qǁ					
Click (top: velar; bottom: uvular)	Voiced lateral				ɡǁ ɢǁ					
Click (top: velar; bottom: uvular)	Nasal lateral				ŋǁ ɴǁ					
