= Doubly articulated consonant =

Consonant with two simultaneous primary places of articulation of the same manner

Doubly articulated consonants are consonants with two simultaneous primary places of articulation of the same manner (both plosive, or both nasal, etc.). They are a subset of co-articulated consonants. They are to be distinguished from co-articulated consonants which have secondary articulation; that is, a second articulation not of the same manner. An example of a doubly articulated consonant is the voiceless labial–velar plosive [k͡p], which is a [k] and a [p] pronounced simultaneously. On the other hand, the voiceless labialized velar plosive [kʷ] has only a single stop articulation, velar [k], with a simultaneous approximant-like rounding of the lips. In some dialects of Arabic, the voiceless velar fricative [x] has a simultaneous uvular trill, but this is not considered double articulation either.

== Possibilities for double articulation ==
There are four independently controllable articulations that may double up in the same manner of articulation: labial, coronal, dorsal, and pharyngeal. (The glottis controls phonation, and works simultaneously with many consonants. It is not normally considered an articulator, so ejectives such as [kʼ], with simultaneous closure of the velum and glottis, are not typically considered doubly articulated consonants.)

No claims have ever been made for doubly articulated flaps or trills, such as a simultaneous alveolar–uvular trill, *[ʀ͡r], and these are not expected to be found. Several claims have been made for doubly articulated fricatives or affricates, most notoriously a Swedish phoneme which has its own IPA symbol, [ɧ]. However, laboratory measurements have never succeeded in demonstrating simultaneous frication at two points of articulation, and such sounds turn out to be either secondary articulation or a sequence of two non-simultaneous fricatives. Such sounds can be made, with effort, but it is very difficult for a listener to discern them, and therefore they are not expected to be found as distinctive sounds in any language.

Clicks are sometimes said to be doubly articulated, as they involve a coronal (more rarely labial) forward articulation, which defines the click and IPA letter variants assigned to them, plus a dorsal closure. However, this second, dorsal place of closure functions as part of the controlling mechanism of the lingual ingressive airstream used to generate the click. Thus, much as the glottal closure of ejectives (the airstream-generating mechanism of such consonants) is not considered to be a second place of articulation, and clicks are not generally described as such either. Indeed, it is possible to have a true doubly articulated click, such as the labial–dental allophone, [ʘ͡ǀ], of the bilabial click /ʘ/ in Taa.

=== Types ===
- Labial–tectal: There are several types of doubly articulated consonants which are composed of a bilabial articulation and a coronal or dorsal one.
  - Labial–coronal: with the lips and the tip, blade, or underside of the tongue.
    - Labial–alveolar: with the lips and the tongue at the alveolar ridge.
    - Labial–postalveolar: with the lips and the tongue at the postalveolar plate.
    - Labial–retroflex: with the lips and the tongue tip or underside of the tongue between the postalveolar plate and the hard palate.
  - Labial–dorsal: with the lips and the back of the tongue (dorsum).
    - Labial–palatal: with the lips and the tongue at the hard palate.
    - Labial–velar: with the lips and the tongue at the soft palate (velum).
    - Labial–uvular: with the lips and the tongue at the uvula.
- Coronal–dorsal: with the tip or blade of the tongue and the back of the tongue.
  - Coronal–velar: with the front of the tongue at the upper teeth or the alveolar ridge and the back of the tongue at the velum. An example of a coronal–velar consonant is one of the coda allophones of /n/ in the Jebero language, which is realized as dentialveolo–velar [n̪͡ŋ].
- Dorsal–pharyngeal: with the back of the tongue and the pharynx or epiglottis.
  - Uvular–epiglottal: with the tongue at the uvula and epiglottis. An example is the Somali "uvular" plosive /q/, which is a voiceless uvular–epiglottal plosive [q͜ʡ], as in [q͜ʡíìq͜ʡ] 'to emit smoke'.

== Double articulation in stops ==
This leaves stops, and both oral and nasal doubly articulated stops are found. However, there is a great asymmetry in the places of their articulation. Of the six possible combinations of labial, coronal, dorsal, and pharyngeal, one is common, and the others vanishingly rare.

- The common articulation is labial–dorsal, which include labial–velar stops such as the [k͡p] mentioned above, and labial–uvular stops such as [q͡p]. Labial–velar stops are found throughout West and Central Africa, as well as eastern New Guinea. Labial-uvular stops are much rarer, but have been found in a Mangbutu–Efe language spoken in the Democratic Republic of the Congo and Uganda: Lese, and a labial–uvular stop has been found in Iha, a language spoken on the Indonesian side of Papua. Lese contains some highly unusual doubly articulated stops that have been confirmed by acoustic and aerodynamic measurements, including a phonemic labial–uvular stop with significant lowering and a stronger release [q͡ɓ], an allophonic voiced labial–velar stop with a voiceless release [ɡ͡p] (which occurs as an allophone of a voiced labial–velar implosive, [ɠɓ]), and an allophonic voiceless labial–velar stop with a trilled release, [k͡ʙ̥] (only present in Efe).
- A second possibility, labial–coronal, is attested phonemically by labial–(post)alveolar and labial–retroflex stops in a single language, Yélî Dnye of New Guinea. Some West African languages, such as Dagbani and Nzema, have labial–postalveolars as allophones of labial–velars before high front vowels.
- A third possibility, coronal–dorsal, is found marginally in a few languages. Isoko, spoken in Nigeria, has laminal dental stops (plosives and nasals) that in some dialects are realized as dental–palatal stops. However, these are not contrastive with either dental or palatal stops, unlike the articulations mentioned above, and Peter Ladefoged considers them to be "accidental contacts in two regions", rather than being inherently double. Hadza has alveolar–palatal lateral affricates, but the dental contact is optional. Similarly, several languages of Australia, such as Maung, have dental–palatals which are variants of laminal postalveolars, with an "extended closure covering the entire region from the teeth to the hard palate". In both cases, the double articulations are variants of laminal consonants, which have inherently broad contact with the roof of the mouth. Rwanda is sometimes noted as having my /mɲ/, by /bɟ/, tw /tkʷ/, etc., but these are consonant sequences, not double articulation.
- The other three possibilities, which would involve the epiglottis, had not been known until recently. However, with the advent of fiber-optic laryngoscopy, a greater variety of epiglottal and laryngeal activity has been found than had been expected. For example, the Somali /q/ was recently found to be a uvular–epiglottal consonant [q͡ʡ]. It is not known how widespread such sounds might be, or if epiglottal consonants might combine with coronal or labial consonants.

== Triple articulation ==
Triply articulated consonants are only attested as glottalized doubly articulated consonants and clicks, and this can be argued to be an effect of phonation or airstream mechanism rather than as a third articulation, just as other glottalized consonants are not considered to be doubly articulated. The most obvious case are the various types of glottalized clicks mentioned above. Another example is 'unreleased' final /k/ in Vietnamese, which after /u/ or /w/ is often labial–velar [k͡p̚ʔ].

== Bibliography ==
- Edmondson, Jerold A.; Esling, John H.; Harris, Jimmy G. (2003). Supraglottal cavity shape, linguistic register, and other phonetic features of Somali (PDF) (Report). Archived from the original (PDF) on 2012-03-15.
- Ladefoged, Peter; Maddieson, Ian (1996). The Sounds of the World's Languages. Oxford: Blackwell. ISBN 0-631-19815-6.
- Valenzuela, Pilar M.; Gussenhoven, Carlos (2013), "Shiwilu (Jebero)" (PDF), Journal of the International Phonetic Association, 43 (1): 97–106, doi:10.1017/S0025100312000370
