= The Sounds of the World's Languages =

1996 book

- Authors: Peter Ladefoged; Ian Maddieson
- Language: English
- Subject: Phonetics
- Publisher: Blackwell Publishers
- Publication date: February 1996
- Pages: 407
- ISBN: 0-631-19814-8

The Sounds of the World's Languages, sometimes abbreviated SOWL, is a 1996 book by Peter Ladefoged and Ian Maddieson which documents a global survey of the sound patterns of natural languages. Drawing from the authors' own fieldwork and experiments as well as existing literature, it provides an articulatory and acoustic description of vowels and consonants from more than 300 languages. It is a prominent reference work in the field of phonetics.

Following discussions of the book's aim and underlying frameworks, the description of sounds is divided into chapters on stops, nasals and nasalized consonants, fricatives, laterals, rhotics, clicks, vowels, and multiple articulatory gestures, which are then followed by a discussion of the data's phonological implications.

== Bibliography ==
- Davis, Katherine (1998). "Peter Ladefoged & Ian Maddieson, The sounds of the world's languages". Journal of Linguistics. 34 (1): 261–264. doi:10.1017/S0022226797276899. S2CID 143044779.
- Fox, Margalit (8 February 2006). "Peter Ladefoged, 80, Linguist Who Was Immersed in Speech, Is Dead". The New York Times.
- Kaye, Alan S. (2006). "An interview with Peter Ladefoged". Journal of the International Phonetic Association. 36 (2): 137–144. doi:10.1017/S0025100306002519.
- Keating, Patricia A. (5 November 2012). "Ladefoged, Peter". In Chapelle, Carol A. (ed.). The Encyclopedia of Applied Linguistics. Wiley. doi:10.1002/9781405198431.wbeal0594. ISBN 9781405194730.
- Maddieson, Ian (2007). "Peter Ladefoged". Language. 83 (1): 181–188. doi:10.1353/lan.2007.0030. JSTOR 4490341. S2CID 210072825.
- Nathan, Geoffrey S. (1998). "The sounds of the world's languages. By Peter Ladefoged and Ian Maddieson". Language. 74 (2): 374–376. doi:10.1353/lan.1998.0168. JSTOR 417875. S2CID 143695404.
- Nelson, Valerie J. (28 January 2006). "Peter Ladefoged, 80; Documented Endangered Languages". Los Angeles Times.
- Rischel, Jørgen (1998). "Review: The Sounds of the World's Languages – Peter Ladefoged and Ian Maddieson". Journal of Phonetics. 26 (4): 411–421. doi:10.1006/jpho.1998.0083.
