= Yele language =

Unclassified language spoken in Papua New Guinea

Yele
- Yélî Dnye
- Pronunciation: [ˈjelɯ ʈɳʲɛ]
- Native to: Papua New Guinea
- Region: Rossel Island, Louisiade Archipelago
- Native speakers: 5,000 (2015)
- Language family: Yele – West New Britain languages ? Austronesian?: Yele

Language codes
- ISO 639-3: yle
- Glottolog: yele1255
- ELP: Yele
- Coordinates: 11°21′S 154°09′E

The Yele language, or Yélî Dnye (IPA: [ˈjelɯ ʈɳʲɛ]), is the language of Rossel Island, the easternmost island in the Louisiade Archipelago off the eastern tip of Papua New Guinea. There were an estimated 5,000 speakers in 2015, comprising the entire ethnic population. It is known for its many doubly articulated consonants. The language remains unclassified by linguists.

== Classification ==
For now, the language is best considered unclassified. It has been classified as a tentative language isolate that may turn out to be related to the Anêm and Ata language isolates of New Britain (in a tentative Yele – West New Britain family), or alternatively closest to Sudest in the Papuan Tip languages of the Oceanic family. Typologically it is more similar to the Oceanic languages of southern New Guinea than to the isolates of New Britain. Word order tends to be subject–object–verb (SOV; verb-final).

Stebbins et al. (2018) classifies Yélî Dnye as an isolate. They explain similarities with Austronesian as being due to contact and diffusion. Usher classifies it as an Oceanic language, with regular sound correspondences obscured by the development of the doubly articulated consonants.

== Phonology ==
=== Consonants ===
Yele has a uniquely rich set of doubly articulated consonants. In nearly all the languages of the world which have them, these are labial–velar consonants—that is, they are pronounced simultaneously with the lips and the back of the tongue, such as a simultaneous p and k. However, Yele is known to contrast other places of articulation: besides labial–velar, it has two distinct labial–coronal articulations, all as both stops and nasals as illustrated below.

There are also doubly articulated approximants: [l͡βʲ] as in lvamê (a type of cane) and [j͡β̞]. /w/ has been described as "labial-dental" or as [w ~ β]. Labial coarticulation does not contrast with labialization with the exception of labiovelars.

The two coronal articulations are

- laminal denti-alveolar, sometimes transcribed ⟨tʸ, nʸ⟩ etc. or simply ⟨t, n⟩ etc.,
- sub-apical retroflex, possibly varying as apical post-alveolar, variously transcribed ⟨ṭ, ṇ⟩ etc., ⟨ʈ, ɳ⟩ etc., or simply ⟨t, n⟩ etc.

Palatalization occurs at all places of articulation. Stops may be either pre-nasalized or post-nasalized.

Altogether, there are 58 attested consonants (56 demonstrated with solid minimal pairs) and one more that is somewhat dubious. The attested inventory is as follows:

Consonants
		Labial				Denti-alveolar				Postalveolar/Retroflex				Velar			Labial-velar	
		plain	lab.	pal.	lab-pal.	plain	lab.	pal.	lab-pal.	plain	lab.	pal.	lab-pal.	plain	lab.	pal.	plain	pal.
Occlusive	oral	p	pʷ	pʲ	pʷʲ	t̪	t̪͡p	t̪ʲ [t͡ɕ]	t̪͡pʲ	ʈ	ʈ͡p	ʈʲ	ʈ͡pʲ	k	kʷ	kʲ	k͡p	k͡pʲ
Occlusive	nasal	m	mʷ	mʲ	mʷʲ	n̪	n̪͡m			ɳ	ɳ͡m	ɳʲ	ɳ͡mʲ	ŋ	ŋʷ		ŋ͡m	
Occlusive	prenasal	ⁿb	ⁿbʷ	ⁿbʲ	ⁿbʷʲ	ⁿd̪	ⁿd̪͡b	ⁿd̪ʲ [ⁿd͡ʑ]	ⁿd̪͡bʲ	ⁿɖ	ⁿɖ͡b	ⁿɖʲ		ⁿɡ	ⁿɡʷ		ⁿɡ͡b	
Occlusive	postnasal									(ʈⁿ)	ʈ͡pⁿ	ʈⁿʲ	ʈ͡pⁿʲ	kⁿ	kⁿʷ		k͡pⁿ	
Continuant		(β)		βʲ		l		lʲ	l͡βʲ			j		ɣ	w			

The oral stops apart from the dentialveolars are lightly voiced between vowels when the following vowel is short, but not when it is long. /ʈ/ is further reduced to a flap [ɽ]. All prenasalized stops are fully voiced. The palatalized denti-alveolar stops /t̪ʲ/ and /ⁿd̪ʲ/ are pronounced as affricates [t͡ɕ] and [ⁿd͡ʑ].

/ʈɳ/ (orthographic dn) is only attested from the inflectional clitic -dniye, and it is not clear that it is distinct from well-attested palatalized /ʈⁿʲ/ (for *-dnyiye). Some palatalized and labialized consonants are only attested from a handful of words. A gap in the chart above, /*ⁿɖ͡bʲ/ (orthographic mdy), is plausible but unattested. Other gaps, namely /*n̪ʲ/ and /*n̪͡mʲ/ (orthographic ńy and nmy) seem to not exist.

=== Vowels ===
Yele has 34 vowel phonemes: ten oral qualities and seven nasal, all with a length contrast:

Vowels
	Front				Central				Back			
	oral		nasal		oral		nasal		oral		nasal	
Close	i	iː	ĩ	ĩː	ɯ	ɯː			u	uː	ũ	ũː
Near-close	e	eː	ɛ̃	ɛ̃ː	ə	əː	ə̃	ə̃ː	o	oː	ɔ̃	ɔ̃ː
Open-mid	ɛ	ɛː	ɛ̃	ɛ̃ː	ə	əː	ə̃	ə̃ː	ɔ	ɔː	ɔ̃	ɔ̃ː
(Near-)open	æ	æː	æ̃	æ̃ː					ɑ	ɑː	ɑ̃	ɑ̃ː

Henderson (1992/2004) interprets vowel sequences as being separated by /j/ or /w/ rather than being in hiatus. (Possibly redundant y or w are found in the sequences iy and uw followed by most short vowels.)

=== Phonotactics ===
Yele words are about half bi-syllabic, about one third monosyllabic, the rest with three or more syllables (words with four or more syllables are largely reduplications or place names).

Nearly all words are composed of open syllables, on a CV+CV pattern. The exception is some 70-odd words ending in orthographic -m, -p, and -y; words ending in -m and -p are also often spelt with a final -î, which is optionally pronounced – one may therefore hold that there is either an underlying î in these words to preserve the CV generalization, or that -î is euphonically introduced (again, to preserve the CV pattern of word formation).

Another exception is the small class of words (c. 50) beginning with a vowel: initial vowels are restricted to a (c. 50 words in the corpus, both lexical and grammatical), except for single segment grammatical morphemes in u and o or ó.

== Orthography ==
Orthography	a	â	b	ch	d	e	é	ê	gh	i	î	j	k	l	m	n	ń	o	ó	p	t	u	v	w	y	꞉V
IPA	æ	ɑ	p	t̪ʲ	ʈ	ɛ	e	ə	ɣ	i	ɯ	t̪ʲ	k	l	m	ɳ	n̪	ɔ	o	p	t̪	u	β	w̪	j	Ṽ

The multigraphs for complex consonants are not always transparent. The labial-velar and labial-coronal consonants are written with the labial second: kp /k͡p/, dp /ʈ͡p/, tp /t̪͡p/, ngm /ŋ͡m/, nm /ɳ͡m/, ńm /n̪͡m/, lv /l͡βʲ/. Prenasalized /mb/ is written mb, but /ⁿd̪/ and /ⁿɡ/ are written nt and nk to distinguish them from nd /ⁿɖ/ and ng /ŋ/. Prenasalized stops are written with an m when labial, including the doubly articulated stops md /ⁿɖ͡b/, mg /ⁿɡ͡b/ and mt /ⁿd̪͡b/, and with n otherwise. Nasal release is likewise written n or m, as in dny /ʈⁿʲ/, kn /kⁿ/, dm /ʈ͡pⁿ/, km /k͡pⁿ/. Labialization is written w, and palatalization y, apart from ch for /t̪ʲ/ and nj for /ⁿd̪ʲ/.

Of the vowels, only a and u occur initially. Long vowels are written double, and nasal vowels with a preceding colon (꞉a for /æ̃/), except for short vowels after an orthographic nasal consonant, where vowel nasality is not contrastive.

== Grammar ==
Yele has been studied extensively by cognitive linguists. It has an extensive set of spatial postpositions. Yele has eleven postpositions equivalent to English on; using different ones depending factors such as whether the object is on a table (horizontal), a wall (vertical), or atop a peak; whether or not it is attached to the surface; and whether it is solid or granular (distributed).

Notably, Yele features extensive lexicalization and suppletion where most other languages would derive one form from another; this may be partially explained by its relative lack of derivational morphology.

- doo pîpî 'he was eating it the day before yesterday or before'
- doo ndîî 'he did not eat it yesterday'
- ∅ ndîî 'he did eat it the day before yesterday or before'
- daa ndîî 'he did not eat it the day before yesterday'
- ∅ ma doo 'he did eat two of them the day before yesterday'
- ∅ ma ngópu 'they2 did eat it the day before yesterday'
- daa ma ngópu 'they2 did not eat it the day before yesterday'

doo pîpî
3S.REM.POS.CONT eat.TR.CONT

doo ndîî
3S.NP.NEG.PUNC eat.TR.PUNC.NEG.NP

∅ ndîî
3S.REM.PUNC eat.TR.PUNC.POS.REM

=== Pronouns ===
Yele has a set of free pronouns and a set of bound possessive pronouns.

		Singular		Dual		Plural	
		English	Yele	English	Yele	English	Yele
1st person	free	I	ɳə	we two	n̪o	we	ɳ͡mo
1st person	bound	I	a	we two	n̪i	we	ɳ͡mɯ
2nd person	free	thou	n̪i	you two	ʈ͡pũ	you	n̪͡mo
2nd person	bound	thou	N-	you two	ʈ͡pɯ	you	n̪͡me
3rd person	free	he/she	–	they two	–	they	–
3rd person	bound	he/she	u	they two	–	they	ji

== Taboos and special registers ==
There are three different types of taboos present in Yélî Dnye: vocabulary avoided by women, vocabulary avoided when in the presence of in-laws, and vocabulary related to sacred places.

Additionally, special registers and terms are used when discussing shell money (kêndapî), at a mortuary feast (kpaakpaa) and during songs.

=== Women's language ===
As a form of women's speech, women avoid certain words, especially those related to the sea. Instead, other words are substituted.

Sample women's language terms
Men's term	Women's term	Gloss
ntii	tpili	sea
nt꞉ee	tpyele	sea (locative)
nee	dyudu	canoe
kwede	kódu yââ/mtene pyu	bailer shell
lyé	pele yââ	coconut mat
mbwaa	tolo	fresh water
Lów꞉a	mwada tpli pee	Lów꞉a isle

=== In-laws ===
Since great respect is shown to in-laws on Rossel Island, speakers of Yélî Dnye will not say their in-laws' names, will only speak of each in-law using the polite third-person plural pronoun yi, and will replace certain words when speaking near them. While the alternative vocabulary is mostly no longer used, the name and pronoun taboos are still observed.

Most of the taboo words are body parts, clothing or carried possessions. Not all body words are replaced, however: for example, 'neck', 'Adam's apple' and 'stomach' retain their everyday forms.

Sample in-law terms
Everyday term	In-law term	Gloss
ngwolo	yi wuché / yi chéé dê	eye
kópu	yi kp꞉aa têdê	words
kêê	yi kéépi	hand
yodo	yi mbwene	belly
péé	yi mgéé	basket
kada	ghââ	in front of
tpe/tpoo	yi tapa	vagina

== Vocabulary ==
Selected basic vocabulary items in Yélî Dnye:

gloss	Yélî Dnye
bird	ńmê; ńmo
blood	wêê
bone	dînê
breast	ngmo
ear	ngweńe
eat	ma
egg	w꞉uu
eye	ngwolo
fire	ndê; ndyuw꞉e
give	yeede
go	lê; lili; nî
ground	mbwóó; têpê
hair	gh꞉aa
head	mbodo
leg	yi
louse	y꞉emê wee
man	pi
moon	d꞉ââ
name	pi
one	ngmidi
road, path	maa
see	m꞉uu
sky	mbóó; vyââ
stone	chêêpî
sun	kââdî
tongue	dêê
tooth	nyóó
tree	yi
two	miyó
water	mbwaa; tolo
woman	kumbwada; pyââ

== Sample text ==
Yélî Dnye:

Kiye w꞉ââ u pi Peetuuki, ka kwo, Doongê. Nê kuu. Daa a w꞉ââ. Nkal u w꞉ââ. Nkal ngê yinê kaa ngê. W꞉ââ dono. Pi yilî u te. U nuu u pi da tóó. Pi u lama daa tóó. M꞉iituwo Yidika, Mépé tp꞉oo mî kiye ngê. Daanté. Mépé dono ngê pyodo. Apê, W꞉ââ mbwamê nînê châpwo. Nkal ngê kwo, "Up꞉o" . W꞉ââ mî mbêpê wo, chii mênê. Mépé ngê w꞉ââ mbwamê mêdîpê châpwo. Awêde ka kwo, Doongê. Pi maa daa t꞉a. A danêmbum u dî.

Phonemic IPA transcription:

ˈki.ɛ wɑ̃ː u pi ˈpɛːt̪uːki | kæ kʷɔ | ˈʈɔːŋə̃ || ɳə̃ kuː || ʈæː æ wɑ̃ː || ⁿɡæl u wɑ̃ː || ⁿɡæl ŋə̃ ˈjiɳə̃ kæː ŋə̃ || wɑ̃ː ˈʈɔɳɔ̃ || pi ˈjilɯ u t̪ɛ || u ɳuː u pi ʈæ t̪oː || pi u ˈlæmæ̃ ʈæː t̪oː || ˈmĩːt̪u.ɔ ˈjiʈiˈkæ | ˈmepe t̪͡pɔ̃ː mɯ̃ ˈki.ɛ ŋə̃ || ˈʈæːⁿd̪e || ˈmepe ʈɔˈɳɔ̃ ŋə̃ ˈpʲɔʈɔ || ˈæpə | wɑ̃ː ˈⁿbʷæmə̃ ˈɳɯ̃ɳə̃ ˈt̪ʲɑpʷɔ || ⁿɡæl ŋə̃ kʷɔ | ˈupɔ̃ || wɑ̃ː mɯ̃ ˈⁿbəpə wɔ | t̪ʲiː ˈmə̃ɳə̃ || meˈpe ŋə̃ wɑ̃ː ˈⁿbʷæmə̃ ˈməʈɯpə ˈt̪ʲɑpʷɔ || æˈwəʈɛ kæ kʷɔ | ˈʈɔːŋə̃ || pi mæː ʈæː t̪æ̃ || æ ˈʈæɳə̃ⁿbum u ʈɯ ||

Phonetic IPA transcription:

ˈki.ɛ β̞ɑ̃ː u pi ˈpɛːt̪uːɡi | kæ kʷɔ | ˈʈɔːŋə̃ || ɳə̃ kuː || ʈæː æ β̞ɑ̃ː || ŋɡæl u β̞ɑ̃ː || ŋɡæl ŋə̃ ˈjiɳə̃ kæː ŋə̃ || β̞ɑ̃ː ˈʈɔɳɔ̃ || pi ˈjilɯ u t̪ɛ || u ɳuː u pi ʈæ t̪oː || pi u ˈlæmæ̃ ʈæː t̪oː || ˈmĩːt̪u.ɔ ˈjiɽiˈɡæ | ˈmebe t̪͡pɔ̃ː mɯ̃ ˈki.ɛ ŋə̃ || ˈʈæːn̪d̪e || ˈmebe ʈɔˈɳɔ̃ ŋə̃ ˈpʲɔɽɔ || ˈæbə | β̞ɑ̃ː ˈmbʷæmə̃ ˈɳɯ̃ɳə̃ ˈt͡ɕɑbʷɔ || ŋɡæl ŋə̃ kʷɔ | ˈubɔ̃ || β̞ɑ̃ː mɯ̃ ˈmbəbə β̞ɔ | t͡ɕiː ˈmə̃ɳə̃ || meˈbe ŋə̃ β̞ɑ̃ː ˈmbʷæmə̃ ˈməɽɯbə ˈt͡ɕɑbʷɔ || æˈβ̞əɽɛ kæ kʷɔ | ˈʈɔːŋə̃ || pi mæː ʈæː t̪æ̃ || æ ˈʈæɳə̃mbum u ʈɯ ||

Translation:

The savage dog is called "Peetuuki", and he lives at Doongê. It's nothing to do with me. It's not my dog. It's Nkal's dog. He raised it. It's a bad dog. It bites everyone. It doesn't like anyone. Recently it bit Mépé's son, Yidika. It really bit him hard. Mépé became very angry, and said, 'I'm going to kill that dog'. The dog ran away into the bush, so Mépé could not kill it. So now it's still there at Doongê, so there's not a safe road through there. That's the end of my story.

(SIL 1992/2004)

== Bibliography ==
- Henderson, James E. (1995). Phonology and Grammar of Yele, Papua New Guinea (PDF). Pacific Linguistics B. Vol. 112. Canberra: Pacific Linguistics. ISBN 0858834286. Archived from the original (PDF) on 2023-10-05.
- Henderson, James E. (2004) [1992]. "Yele Organised Phonology Data". SIL.
- Henderson, James E.; Anne Henderson, compilers (1999) [1987]. Rossel to English, English to Rossel Dictionary. Dictionaries of Papua New Guinea. Vol. 9. Ukarumpa: Summer Institute of Linguistics.
- Ladefoged, Peter; Ian Maddieson (1996). The Sounds of the World's Languages. Oxford: Blackwell's. ISBN 0-631-19814-8.
- Levinson, Stephen C. (2003). Space in Language and Cognition: Explorations in Cognitive Diversity. Cambridge: Cambridge University Press. ISBN 0-521-01196-5.
- Levinson, Stephen C. (2022). A Grammar of Yélî Dnye: The Papuan Language of Rossel Island. De Gruyter. doi:10.1515/9783110733853. ISBN 978-3-11-073385-3. S2CID 249083265.
- Stebbins, Tonya; Evans, Bethwyn; Terrill, Angela (2018). "The Papuan languages of Island Melanesia". In Palmer, Bill (ed.). The Languages and Linguistics of the New Guinea Area: A Comprehensive Guide. The World of Linguistics. Vol. 4. Berlin: De Gruyter Mouton. pp. 775–894. ISBN 978-3-11-028642-7.
