= Secondary articulation =

Type of consonant sound

In phonetics, secondary articulation occurs when the articulation of a consonant is equivalent to the combined articulations of two or three simpler consonants, at least one of which is usually an approximant. The secondary articulation of such co-articulated consonants is the approximant-like articulation. It "colors" the primary articulation rather than obscuring it. Maledo (2011) defines secondary articulation as the superimposition of lesser stricture upon a primary articulation.

== Types ==
There are several kinds of secondary articulation supported by the International Phonetic Alphabet:

- Labialization is the most frequently encountered secondary articulation. For example, labialized [kʷ] has a primary velar plosive articulation, [k], with simultaneous [w]-like rounding of the lips, thus the name. It is in contrast to the doubly articulated labial-velar consonant [k͡p], which is articulated with two overlapping plosive articulations, [k] and [p].
- Palatalization is perhaps best known from the Russian "soft" consonants like [tʲ], which has a primary alveolar plosive articulation, [t], with simultaneous [j]-like (i.e. y-like) raising of the body of the tongue.
- Labio-palatalization is simultaneous [ɥ]-like labialization and palatalization. It is found, for example, in the name Twi, [tɕᶣi].
- Velarization is the raising of the back of the tongue toward the velum, as in the English "dark" L, [lˠ].
- Pharyngealization is a constriction in the throat (pharynx) and is found in the Arabic "emphatic" consonants such as [sˤ].
- Glottalization involves action of the glottis in addition to the primary articulation of the consonant.

It can sometimes be difficult to distinguish primary and secondary articulation. For example, the alveolo-palatal consonants [ɕ ʑ] are sometimes characterized as a distinct primary articulation and sometimes as palatalization of postalveolar fricatives, equivalent to [ʃʲ ʒʲ] or [s̠ʲ z̠ʲ].

== Transcription ==
The most common method of transcription in the IPA is to turn the letter corresponding to the secondary articulation into a superscript written after the letter for the primary articulation. For example, the w in ⟨kʷ⟩ is written after the k. This can be misleading, as it iconically suggests that the [k] is released into a [w] sound, analogous to ⟨kˡ kⁿ⟩ ([k] with a lateral and nasal release), while the two articulations of [kʷ] are often pronounced simultaneously; though secondary articulation may still be more release-like in other cases.

Secondary articulation often has a strong effect on surrounding vowels, and may have an audible realization that precedes the primary consonant, or both precedes and follows it. For example, /akʷa/ will not generally sound simply like [akwa], but may be closer to [awkwa] or even [awka]. For this reason, the IPA symbols for labialization and palatalization were for a time placed under the primary letter (e.g. ⟨k̫⟩ for [kʷ] and ⟨ƫ⟩ for [tʲ]), and a number of phoneticians still prefer such unambiguous usage, with ⟨kʷ⟩ and ⟨tʲ⟩ used specifically for off-glides, despite the official policy of the IPA. In the official IPA there remains only an alternative symbol for velarization/pharyngealizaton that is superposed over the primary (e.g. ⟨ɫ⟩ for dark L), but that has font support for a limited number of consonants and is inadvisable for others, where it can be illegible. A few phoneticians use superscript letters for offglides and subscript letters for simultaneous articulation (e.g. ⟨tʲ⟩ vs ⟨tⱼ⟩).

There is a longstanding tradition in the IPA that one may turn any IPA letter into a superscript, and in so doing impart its features to the base consonant. For instance, [ʃˢ] would be an articulation of [ʃ] that has qualities of [s]. However, the features are not necessarily imparted as secondary articulation. Superscripts are also used iconically to indicate the onset or release of a consonant, the on-glide or off-glide of a vowel, and fleeting or weak segments. Among others, these phenomena include pre-nasalization ([ᵐb]), pre-stopping ([ᵖm, ᵗs]), affrication ([tᶴ]), pre-affrication ([ˣk]), trilled, fricative, nasal, and lateral release ([tʳ, tᶿ, dⁿ, dˡ]), rhoticization ([ɑʵ]), and diphthongs ([aᶷ]). So, while ⟨ˠ⟩ indicates velarization of non-velar consonants, it is also used for fricative release of the velar stop (⟨ɡˠ⟩). Mixed consonant-vowels may indicate a transition: [ᵇa] may be the allophone of /a/ with the transition from /b/ that identifies the consonant, while [fʸ] may be the allophone of /f/ before /y/, or the formants of /y/ anticipated in the /f/.

The 2015 edition of the Extensions to the International Phonetic Alphabet formally advocates superscript letters for the first time since 1989, specifically for the release of plosives.

== See also ==
- Labialization
- Labio-palatalization
- Palatalization (phonetics)
- Pharyngealization
- Velarization
- superscript Latin and Greek letters

== Sources ==
- MacMahon, Michael K. C. (2010). "The International Phonetic Alphabet". In Malmkjaer, Kirsten (ed.). The Routledge Linguistics Encyclopedia (3rd ed.). Routledge. pp. 269–275. ISBN 978-0-415-42104-1.
