= Velarization =

Type of secondary articulation in speech

Velarized

◌ˠ
- IPA number: 422

Encoding
- Entity (decimal): &#736;
- Unicode (hex): U+02E0
Image

Velarized or pharyngealized

◌̴
- IPA number: 428

Encoding
- Entity (decimal): &#820;
- Unicode (hex): U+0334
Image

Velarization or velarisation is a secondary articulation of consonants by which the back of the tongue is raised toward the velum during the articulation of the consonant. In the International Phonetic Alphabet, velarization is transcribed by one of four diacritics:

- A tilde or swung dash through the letter U+0334 ◌̴ COMBINING TILDE OVERLAY covers velarization, uvularization and pharyngealization, as in [ɫ] (the velarized equivalent of [l])
- A superscript Latin gamma U+02E0 ˠ MODIFIER LETTER SMALL GAMMA after the letter standing for the velarized consonant, as in ⟨tˠ⟩ (a velarized [t])
- To distinguish velarization from a velar fricative release, U+1D5A ᵚ MODIFIER LETTER SMALL TURNED M may be used instead of ⟨ˠ⟩, as in ⟨pᵚ⟩
- A superscript ⟨w⟩ U+02B7 ʷ MODIFIER LETTER SMALL W may be used to indicate simultaneous velarization with labialization, as in ⟨sʷ⟩, but is often used more broadly for protruded labialization, without specifying velarization.

Although electropalatographic studies have shown that there is a continuum of possible degrees of velarization, the IPA does not specify any way to indicate degrees of velarization, as the difference has not been found to be contrastive in any language. However, the IPA convention of doubling diacritics to indicate a greater degree can be used: ⟨ˠˠ⟩.

== Examples ==
=== English ===
A common example of a velarized consonant is the velarized alveolar lateral approximant (or "dark L"). In some accents of English, such as Received Pronunciation and General American English, the phoneme /l/ has "dark" and "light" (also called "clear") allophones: the "dark", velarized allophone [ɫ] appears in syllable coda position (e.g. in full), while the "light", non-velarized allophone [l] appears in syllable onset position (e.g. in lawn). Other accents of English, such as Scottish English, Australian English, and potentially standard U.S. and Canadian accents, have "dark L" in all positions.

=== Velarized /l/ ===
- Albanian phonemically contrasts light l and dark ll
- Catalan dialect and allophonic variance
- Portuguese dialect and allophonic variance
- Turkish
- Kurdish

For many languages, velarization is generally associated with more dental articulations of coronal consonants so that dark l tends to be dental or dentoalveolar, and clear l tends to be retracted to an alveolar position.

=== Other velarized consonants ===
- Danish realizes /d/ in some environments as a velarized [ð].
- Irish and Marshallese have velarized consonants that systematically contrast with palatalized consonants.
- Similarly, Russian has velarized consonants as allophones of the non-palatalized (plain) series, especially prominent before front vowels and with labial and velar consonants as well as the lateral.
- Scottish Gaelic has a three-way contrast in nasals and laterals between [n ~ n̪ˠ ~ ɲ] and [l ~ l̪ˠ ~ ʎ]
- Kurdish has three velarized consonants (/ɫ/, /sˠ/, and /zˠ/) which contrast with plain ones.
- Gilbertese has three velarized consonants (/mˠ/, /pˠ/, and /βˠ/), two of which (/mˠ/ and /pˠ/) contrast with a plain form.

The palatalized/velarized contrast is known by other names, especially in language pedagogy: in Irish and Scottish Gaelic language teaching, the terms slender (for palatalized) and broad (for velarized) are often used. In Scottish Gaelic the terms are caol (for palatalized) and leathann (for velarized).

The terms light or clear (for non-velarized or palatalized) and dark (for velarized) are also widespread. The terms "soft l " and "hard l " are not equivalent to "light l " and "dark l ". The former pair refers to palatalized ("soft" or iotated) and plain ("hard") Slavic consonants.

== See also ==
- Palatalization (phonetics)

== Sources ==
- Recasens, Daniel; Fontdevila, J; Pallarès, Maria Dolores (1995), "Velarization degree and coarticulatory resistance for /l/ in Catalan and German", Journal of Phonetics, 23 (1–2): 37–52, doi:10.1016/S0095-4470(95)80031-X
- Recasens, Daniel; Espinosa, Aina (2005), "Articulatory, positional and coarticulatory characteristics for clear /l/ and dark /l/: evidence from two Catalan dialects", Journal of the International Phonetic Association, 35 (1): 1–25, doi:10.1017/S0025100305001878, S2CID 14140079
- Jones, Daniel; Ward, Dennis (1969), The Phonetics of Russian, Cambridge University Press, ISBN 9780521153003
