= Voiceless labial–velar plosive =

Consonantal sound represented by ⟨k͡p⟩ in IPA

k͡p
- IPA number: 109 (101)

Audio sample
- source · help

Encoding
- Entity (decimal): &#107;&#865;&#112;
- Unicode (hex): U+006B U+0361 U+0070
Image

A voiceless labial–velar plosive or stop is a type of consonantal sound, used in some spoken languages. It is a [k] and [p] pronounced simultaneously and is considered a double articulation. To make this sound, one can say Coe but with the lips closed as if one were saying Poe; the lips are to be released at the same time as or a fraction of a second after the C of Coe. The symbol in the International Phonetic Alphabet that represents this sound is ⟨k͡p⟩ ~ ⟨k͜p⟩.

A voiceless labial–velar plosive is found in Vietnamese and various languages in West and Central Africa. In the orthography of Yoruba in Nigeria it is written with a simple ⟨p⟩.

Some languages, especially in Papua New Guinea and in Vanuatu, combine this voiceless labial–velar stop with a labial–velar approximant release, hence [k͡pʷ]. Thus Mwotlap (Banks Islands, north Vanuatu) has [k͡pʷɪlɣɛk] ('my father-in-law').

In the Banks Islands languages which have it, the phoneme /k͡pʷ/ is written ⟨q⟩ in local orthographies. In other languages of Vanuatu further south (such as South Efate, or Lenakel), the same segment is spelled ⟨p̃⟩.

== Features ==
Features of a voiceless labial–velar stop:

- Its manner of articulation is occlusive, which means it is produced by obstructing airflow in the vocal tract. Since the consonant is also oral, with no nasal outlet, it is a plosive.
- Its place of articulation is labial–velar, which means it is simultaneously articulated with the lips and with the back part of the tongue (the dorsum) against the soft palate (the velum). The dorsal closure is made and released slightly before the labial closure, but they overlap for most of their duration.
- Its phonation is voiceless, which means it is produced without vibrations of the vocal cords.
- It is an oral consonant, which means that air is not allowed to escape through the nose.
- It is a median consonant, which means it is produced by directing the airstream down the midline of the tongue, rather than to the sides.
- Its airstream mechanism is pulmonic, which means it is articulated by pushing air only with the intercostal muscles and abdominal muscles, as in most speech sounds.

== Occurrence ==
| Language | Word | IPA | Meaning | Notes |
|---|---|---|---|---|
| Dangme | kpà | [k͡pà] | 'to roam' | |
| Ega | [k͡pá] | | 'build a hedge to enclose a field' | |
| Ewe | akpa | [ak͡pa] | 'fish' | |
| Ibibio | kpa | [k͡pɐ́] | 'to die' | |
| Igbo | kpọ́ | [k͡pɔ́] | 'call' | |
| Kalabari | àkpà | [àk͡pà] | 'bag' | |
| Mono | kpa | [k͡pa] | 'flee' | |
| Nigerian Pidgin | kpakpa | [k͡pak͡pa] | 'completely' | Phonemic. Found in substrate words and later loanwords from native Nigerian languages. Often used in ideophonic contexts. See Nigerian Pidgin#Phonology. |
| Saramaccan | akpó | [ak͡pó] | 'arrow type' | Possibly allophonic with /kʷ/, but possibly phonemic as well. |
| Vietnamese | lúc | [luk͡p˧˥] | 'when, time' | Allophone of /k/ after /u, o, ɔ/. See Vietnamese phonology |
| Tarok | kpán | [k͡pán] | 'to hold' / 'to catch' | |
| Tyap | kpa | [k͡pa] | 'pestle' | |
| Yoruba | pápá | [k͡pák͡pá] | 'field' | |

== See also ==
- List of phonetics topics
- Doubly articulated consonant
- Co-articulated consonant

== Notes ==
| Place → | Labial | | | | | Coronal | | | | | | | | | | Dorsal | | | | | Laryngeal | | | |
| Manner ↓ | Bilabial | | Labiodental | | Linguolabial | | Dental | | Alveolar | | Postalveolar | | Retroflex | | (Alveolo-)palatal | | Velar | | Uvular | | Pharyngeal/epiglottal | | Glottal | |
|---|---|---|---|---|---|---|---|---|---|---|---|---|---|---|---|---|---|---|---|---|---|---|---|---|
| Nasal | m̥ | m | ɱ̊ | ɱ | | n̼ | n̪̊ | n̪ | n̥ | n | n̠̊ | n̠ | ɳ̊ | ɳ | ɲ̊ | ɲ | ŋ̊ | ŋ | ɴ̥ | ɴ | | | | |
| Plosive | p | b | p̪ | b̪ | t̼ | d̼ | t̪ | d̪ | t | d | | | ʈ | ɖ | c | ɟ | k | ɡ | q | ɢ | ʡ | | ʔ | |
| Sibilant affricate | | | | | | | t̪s̪ | d̪z̪ | ts | dz | t̠ʃ | d̠ʒ | tʂ | dʐ | tɕ | dʑ | | | | | | | | |
| Non-sibilant affricate | pɸ | bβ | p̪f | b̪v | | | t̪θ | d̪ð | tɹ̝̊ | dɹ̝ | t̠ɹ̠̊˔ | d̠ɹ̠˔ | | | cç | ɟʝ | kx | ɡɣ | qχ | ɢʁ | ʡʜ | ʡʢ | ʔh | |
| Sibilant fricative | | | | | | | s̪ | z̪ | s | z | ʃ | ʒ | ʂ | ʐ | ɕ | ʑ | | | | | | | | |
| Non-sibilant fricative | ɸ | β | f | v | θ̼ | ð̼ | θ | ð | θ̠ | ð̠ | ɹ̠̊˔ | ɹ̠˔ | ɻ̊˔ | ɻ˔ | ç | ʝ | x | ɣ | χ | ʁ | ħ | ʕ | h | ɦ |
| Approximant | | β̞ | | ʋ | | | | ð̞ | | ɹ | | ɹ̠ | | ɻ | | j | | ɰ | | | | | | ˷ |
| Tap/flap | | ⱱ̟ | | ⱱ | | | | | ɾ̥ | ɾ | | | ɽ̊ | ɽ | | | | | | ɢ̆ | | ʡ̆ | | |
| Trill | ʙ̥ | ʙ | | | | | | | r̥ | r | | r̠ | ɽ̊r̥ | ɽr | | | | | ʀ̥ | ʀ | ʜ | ʢ | | |
| Lateral affricate | | | | | | | | | tɬ | dɮ | | | tꞎ | d𝼅 | c𝼆 | ɟʎ̝ | k𝼄 | ɡʟ̝ | | | | | | |
| Lateral fricative | | | | | | | ɬ̪ | | ɬ | ɮ | | | ꞎ | 𝼅 | 𝼆 | ʎ̝ | 𝼄 | ʟ̝ | | | | | | |
| Lateral approximant | | | | | | | | l̪ | l̥ | l | | l̠ | ɭ̊ | ɭ | ʎ̥ | ʎ | ʟ̥ | ʟ | | ʟ̠ | | | | |
| Lateral tap/flap | | | | | | | | | ɺ̥ | ɺ | | | 𝼈̊ | 𝼈 | | ʎ̆ | | ʟ̆ | | | | | | |

| | | BL | LD | D | A | PA | RF | P | V | U |
|---|---|---|---|---|---|---|---|---|---|---|
| Implosive | Voiced | ɓ | | | ɗ | | ᶑ | ʄ | ɠ | ʛ |
| Implosive | Voiceless | ɓ̥ | | | ɗ̥ | | ᶑ̊ | ʄ̊ | ɠ̊ | ʛ̥ |
| Ejective | Stop | pʼ | | | tʼ | | ʈʼ | cʼ | kʼ | qʼ |
| Ejective | Affricate | | p̪fʼ | t̪θʼ | tsʼ | t̠ʃʼ | tʂʼ | tɕʼ | kxʼ | qχʼ |
| Ejective | Fricative | ɸʼ | fʼ | θʼ | sʼ | ʃʼ | ʂʼ | ɕʼ | xʼ | χʼ |
| Ejective | Lateral affricate | | | | tɬʼ | | | c𝼆ʼ | k𝼄ʼ | q𝼄ʼ |
| Ejective | Lateral fricative | | | | ɬʼ | | | | | |
| Click (top: velar; bottom: uvular) | Tenuis | kʘ qʘ | | kǀ qǀ | kǃ qǃ | | k𝼊 q𝼊 | kǂ qǂ | | |
| Click (top: velar; bottom: uvular) | Voiced | ɡʘ ɢʘ | | ɡǀ ɢǀ | ɡǃ ɢǃ | | ɡ𝼊 ɢ𝼊 | ɡǂ ɢǂ | | |
| Click (top: velar; bottom: uvular) | Nasal | ŋʘ ɴʘ | | ŋǀ ɴǀ | ŋǃ ɴǃ | | ŋ𝼊 ɴ𝼊 | ŋǂ ɴǂ | ʞ | |
| Click (top: velar; bottom: uvular) | Tenuis lateral | | | | kǁ qǁ | | | | | |
| Click (top: velar; bottom: uvular) | Voiced lateral | | | | ɡǁ ɢǁ | | | | | |
| Click (top: velar; bottom: uvular) | Nasal lateral | | | | ŋǁ ɴǁ | | | | | |
