= Place of articulation =

Place in the mouth consonants are articulated

Common approximate places of articulation (passive & active): 1. Exo-labial, 2. Endo-labial, 3. Dental, 4. Alveolar, 5. Post-alveolar, 6. Pre-palatal, 7. Palatal, 8. Velar, 9. Uvular, 10. Pharyngeal, 11. Glottal, 12. Epiglottal, 13. Radical, 14. Postero-dorsal, 15. Antero-dorsal, 16. Laminal, 17. Apical, 18. Sub-apical

In articulatory phonetics, the place of articulation (also point of articulation) of a consonant is an approximate location along the vocal tract where its production occurs. It is a point where a constriction is made between an active and a passive articulator. Active articulators are organs capable of voluntary movement which create the constriction, while passive articulators are so called because they are normally fixed and are the parts with which an active articulator makes contact. Along with the manner of articulation and phonation, the place of articulation gives the consonant its distinctive sound.

Since vowels are produced with an open vocal tract, the point where their production occurs cannot be easily determined. Therefore, they are not described in terms of a place of articulation but by the relative positions in vowel space. This is mostly dependent on their formant frequencies and less on the specific tongue position and lip rounding.

The terminology used in describing places of articulation has been developed to allow specifying of all theoretically possible contrasts. No known language distinguishes all of the places described in the literature, so less precision is needed to distinguish the sounds of a particular language.

== Overview ==
The human voice produces sounds in the following manner:

1. Air pressure from the lungs creates a steady flow of air through the trachea (windpipe), larynx (voice box) and pharynx (back of the throat). Therefore, the air moves out of the lungs through a coordinated action of the diaphragm, abdominal muscles, chest muscles and rib cage.
2. The vocal folds in the larynx vibrate, creating fluctuations in air pressure, known as sound waves.
3. Resonances in the vocal tract modify these waves according to the position and shape of the lips, jaw, tongue, soft palate, and other speech organs, creating formant regions and so different qualities of sonorant (voiced) sound.
4. Mouth radiates the sound waves into the environment.
5. Nasal cavity adds resonance to some sounds such as [m] and [n] to give nasal quality of the so-called nasal consonants.

== The larynx ==
The larynx or voice box is a cylindrical framework of cartilage that serves to anchor the vocal folds. When the muscles of the vocal folds contract, the airflow from the lungs is impeded until the vocal folds are forced apart again by the increasing air pressure from the lungs. The process continues in a periodic cycle that is felt as a vibration (buzzing). In singing, the vibration frequency of the vocal folds determines the pitch of the sound produced. Voiced phonemes such as the pure vowels are, by definition, distinguished by the buzzing sound of this periodic oscillation of the vocal cords.

The lips of the mouth can be used in a similar way to create a similar sound, as any toddler or trumpeter can demonstrate. A rubber balloon, inflated but not tied off and stretched tightly across the neck produces a squeak or buzz, depending on the tension across the neck and the level of pressure inside the balloon. Similar actions with similar results occur when the vocal cords are contracted or relaxed across the larynx.

== Active articulators ==
The active articulators are movable parts of the vocal apparatus that impede or direct the airstream, typically some part of the tongue or lips. There are five major parts of the vocal tract that move: the lips, the flexible front of the tongue, the body of the tongue, the root of the tongue together with the epiglottis, and the glottis. They are discrete in that they can act independently of each other, and two or more may work together in what is called coarticulation.

The five main active parts can be further divided, as many languages contrast sounds produced within the same major part of the vocal apparatus. The following 9 degrees of active articulatory areas are known to be contrastive (sorted such that the top-most is in the front-most area of the mouth and the bottom-most is in the rear-most area of the mouth):

- The lower lip (labial)
- Various parts of the front of the tongue (coronal):
  - The tip of the tongue (apical)
  - The upper front surface of the tongue just behind the tip, called the blade of the tongue (laminal)
  - The surface of the tongue under the tip (subapical)
- The body of the tongue (dorsal) which is sometimes further divided into front and back
- The base a.k.a. root of the tongue and the throat (pharyngeal)
- The aryepiglottic fold inside the throat (aryepiglottal)
- The glottis at the very back of the windpipe (glottal)

In bilabial consonants, both lips move so the articulatory gesture brings the lips together, but by convention, the lower lip is said to be active and the upper lip passive. Similarly, in linguolabial consonants the tongue contacts the upper lip with the upper lip actively moving down to meet the tongue; nonetheless, the tongue is conventionally said to be active and the lip passive if for no other reason than that the parts of the mouth below the vocal tract are typically active, and those above the vocal tract are typically passive.

In dorsal gestures, different parts of the body of the tongue contact different parts of the roof of the mouth, but it cannot be independently controlled so they are all subsumed under the term dorsal. That is unlike coronal gestures involving the front of the tongue, which is more flexible.

The epiglottis may be active, contacting the pharynx, or passive, being contacted by the aryepiglottal folds. Distinctions made in these laryngeal areas are very difficult to observe and are the subject of ongoing investigation, and several still-unidentified combinations are thought possible.

The glottis acts upon itself. There is a sometimes fuzzy line between glottal, aryepiglottal, and epiglottal consonants and phonation, which uses these same areas.

== Passive articulators ==
The passive are the more stationary parts of the vocal tract that the active articulator touches or gets close to; they can be anywhere from the lips, upper teeth, gums, or roof of the mouth to the back of the throat. Although it is a continuum, there are several contrastive areas so languages may distinguish consonants by articulating them in different areas, but few languages contrast two sounds within the same area unless there is some other feature which contrasts as well. The following 9 degrees of passive articulatory areas are known to be contrastive (sorted such that the top-most is in the front-most area of the mouth and the bottom-most is in the rear-most area of the mouth):

- The upper lip (labial)
- The upper teeth, either on the edge of the teeth or inner surface (dental)
- The alveolar ridge, the gum line just behind the teeth (alveolar)
- The back of the alveolar ridge (post-alveolar)
- The hard palate on the roof of the mouth (palatal)
- The soft palate further back on the roof of the mouth (velar)
- The uvula hanging down at the entrance to the throat (uvular)
- The throat itself, a.k.a. the pharynx (pharyngeal)
- The epiglottis at the entrance to the windpipe, above the voice box (epiglottal)

The regions are not strictly separated. For instance, in some sounds in many languages, the surface of the tongue contacts a relatively large area from the back of the upper teeth to the alveolar ridge, which is common enough to have received its own name, denti-alveolar. Likewise, the alveolar and post-alveolar regions merge into each other, as do the hard and soft palate, the soft palate and the uvula, and all adjacent regions. Terms like pre-velar (intermediate between palatal and velar), post-velar (between velar and uvular), and upper vs. lower pharyngeal may be used to specify more precisely where an articulation takes place. However, although a language may contrast pre-velar and post-velar sounds, it does not also contrast them with palatal and uvular sounds (of the same type of consonant) so contrasts are limited to the number above, if not always their exact location.

== Table of articulation combinations ==
The following table shows the possible combinations of active and passive articulators.

The possible locations for sibilants to occur are indicated in yellow. For sibilants, there are additional complications involving tongue shape; see Sibilant § Possible combinations for a chart of possible articulations.

Major class →	Labial		Coronal			"Guttural"		
Active articulator →	Upper lip	Lower lip	Tongue blade (Laminal)	Tongue tip (Apical)	Underside of tongue (Subapical)	Tongue body (Dorsal)	Tongue root (Radical)	Larynx (Laryngeal)
Passive articulator ↓	Upper lip	Lower lip	Tongue blade (Laminal)	Tongue tip (Apical)	Underside of tongue (Subapical)	Tongue body (Dorsal)	Tongue root (Radical)	Larynx (Laryngeal)
Lower lip	bilabial				labiolingual			
Upper lip		bilabial	linguolabial					
Lower teeth	dentolabial		interdental					
Upper teeth		labiodental	interdental					
Upper teeth		labiodental	dental					
Upper teeth/alveolar ridge			denti-alveolar					
Alveolar ridge			lamino-alveolar	apico-alveolar				
Back of alveolar ridge (postalveolar)			palato-alveolar	apical retroflex	retroflex	alveolo-palatal		
Hard palate (front)			alveolo-palatal	apical retroflex	retroflex	palatal		
Soft palate					subapical velar (Note: Although physically possible to produce, subapical velars are not attested as occurring in any language.)	velar		
Uvula						uvular		
Pharynx							radico-pharyngeal	epiglotto-pharyngeal
Epiglottis								aryepiglottal
Glottis								glottal

A precise vocabulary of compounding the two places of articulation is sometimes seen. However, it is usually reduced to the passive articulation, which is generally sufficient. Thus dorsal–palatal, dorsal–velar, and dorsal–uvular are usually just called "palatal", "velar", and "uvular". If there is ambiguity, additional terms have been invented, so subapical–palatal is more commonly called "retroflex".

Additional shades of passive articulation are sometimes specified using pre- or post-, for example prepalatal (near the border between the postalveolar region and the hard palate); prevelar or post-palatal (at the back of the hard palate or near the border of the hard and soft palates; also medio-palatal for the middle of the hard palate); postvelar or preuvular (near the border of the soft palate and the uvula). They can be useful in the precise description of sounds that are articulated somewhat farther forward or back than a prototypical consonant; for this purpose, the "fronted" and "retracted" IPA diacritics for relative articulation can be used. However, no additional shade is needed to phonemically distinguish two consonants in a single language. (Note: Occasionally claims to the contrary are met. For example, some dialects of Malayalam are said to distinguish palatal, prevelar and velar consonants. In reality, the dialects distinguish palato-alveolar (palatalized postalveolar), palatal and velar consonants; the claim is based on the imprecise usage of "palatal" to mean "palato-alveolar".)

== Homorganic consonants ==
Consonants that have the same place of articulation, such as the alveolar sounds /n, t, d, s, z, l/ in English, are said to be homorganic. Similarly, labial /p, b, m/ and velar /k, ɡ, ŋ/ are homorganic. A homorganic nasal rule, an instance of assimilation, operates in many languages, where a nasal consonant must be homorganic with a following stop. This is seen with English intolerable but implausible; another example is found in Yoruba, where the present tense of ba "hide" is mba "is hiding", while the present of sun "sleep" is nsun "is sleeping".

== Central and lateral articulation ==
The tongue contacts the mouth with a surface that has two dimensions: length and width. So far, only points of articulation along its length have been considered. However, articulation varies along its width as well. When the airstream is directed down the center of the tongue, the consonant is said to be central. If, however, it is deflected off to one side, escaping between the side of the tongue and the side teeth, it is said to be lateral. Nonetheless, for simplicity's sake the place of articulation is assumed to be the point along the length of the tongue, and the consonant may in addition be said to be central or lateral. That is, a consonant may be lateral alveolar, like English /l/ (the tongue contacts the alveolar ridge, but allows air to flow off to the side), or lateral palatal, like Castilian Spanish ll /ʎ/. Some Indigenous Australian languages contrast dental, alveolar, retroflex, and palatal laterals, and many Native American languages have lateral fricatives and affricates as well.

== Coarticulation ==
Some languages have consonants with two simultaneous places of articulation, which is called coarticulation. When these are doubly articulated, the articulators must be independently movable, and therefore there may be only one each from the major categories labial, coronal, dorsal and pharyngeal.

The only common doubly articulated consonants are labial–velar stops like [k͡p], [ɡ͡b] and less commonly [ŋ͡m], which are found throughout Western Africa and Central Africa. Other combinations are rare but include labial–(post)alveolar stops [t͡p d͡b n͡m], found as phonemes in Yélî Dnye and [t͡p t͡pʼ d͡b] found in a few Caucasian languages like Abkhaz and allophonically in Nzema. Yeli also has a set of Labial–retroflex stops /ʈ͡p, ɖ͡b, ɳ͡m/. Other rare double articulates consonants include a uvular–epiglottal stop, [q͡ʡ], is found in Somali, phonemic alveolar-velar [k͡t] in Yaqui and rarely phonemic in Yamdena, labial–uvular /q͡p/ in Iha and doubly articulated implosives like /ɠ̊͜ɓ̥, ɠ͡ɓ/ in certain Igbo dialects.

More commonly, coarticulation involves secondary articulation of an approximantic nature. Then, both articulations can be similar such as labialized labial [mʷ] or palatalized velar [kʲ]. That is the case of English [w], which is a velar consonant with secondary labial articulation.

Common coarticulations include these:

- Labialization, rounding the lips while producing the obstruction, as in [kʷ] and English [w].
- Palatalization, raising the body of the tongue toward the hard palate while producing the obstruction, as in Russian [tʲ] and [ɕ].
- Velarization, raising the back of the tongue toward the soft palate (velum), as in the English dark el, [lˠ] (also transcribed [ɫ]).
- Pharyngealization, constriction of the throat (pharynx), such as Arabic "emphatic" [tˤ].

== See also ==
- Articulatory phonetics
- Manner of articulation
- Relative articulation
- Index of phonetics articles

== Notes ==
Place →	Labial					Coronal										Dorsal					Laryngeal			
Manner ↓	Bilabial		Labiodental		Linguolabial		Dental		Alveolar		Postalveolar		Retroflex		(Alveolo-)palatal		Velar		Uvular		Pharyngeal/epiglottal		Glottal	
Nasal	m̥	m	ɱ̊	ɱ		n̼	n̪̊	n̪	n̥	n	n̠̊	n̠	ɳ̊	ɳ	ɲ̊	ɲ	ŋ̊	ŋ	ɴ̥	ɴ				
Plosive	p	b	p̪	b̪	t̼	d̼	t̪	d̪	t	d			ʈ	ɖ	c	ɟ	k	ɡ	q	ɢ	ʡ		ʔ	
Sibilant affricate							t̪s̪	d̪z̪	ts	dz	t̠ʃ	d̠ʒ	tʂ	dʐ	tɕ	dʑ								
Non-sibilant affricate	pɸ	bβ	p̪f	b̪v			t̪θ	d̪ð	tɹ̝̊	dɹ̝	t̠ɹ̠̊˔	d̠ɹ̠˔			cç	ɟʝ	kx	ɡɣ	qχ	ɢʁ	ʡʜ	ʡʢ	ʔh	
Sibilant fricative							s̪	z̪	s	z	ʃ	ʒ	ʂ	ʐ	ɕ	ʑ								
Non-sibilant fricative	ɸ	β	f	v	θ̼	ð̼	θ	ð	θ̠	ð̠	ɹ̠̊˔	ɹ̠˔	ɻ̊˔	ɻ˔	ç	ʝ	x	ɣ	χ	ʁ	ħ	ʕ	h	ɦ
Approximant		β̞		ʋ				ð̞		ɹ		ɹ̠		ɻ		j		ɰ						˷
Tap/flap		ⱱ̟		ⱱ					ɾ̥	ɾ			ɽ̊	ɽ						ɢ̆		ʡ̆		
Trill	ʙ̥	ʙ							r̥	r		r̠	ɽ̊r̥	ɽr					ʀ̥	ʀ	ʜ	ʢ		
Lateral affricate									tɬ	dɮ			tꞎ	d𝼅	c𝼆	ɟʎ̝	k𝼄	ɡʟ̝						
Lateral fricative							ɬ̪		ɬ	ɮ			ꞎ	𝼅	𝼆	ʎ̝	𝼄	ʟ̝						
Lateral approximant								l̪	l̥	l		l̠	ɭ̊	ɭ	ʎ̥	ʎ	ʟ̥	ʟ		ʟ̠				
Lateral tap/flap									ɺ̥	ɺ			𝼈̊	𝼈		ʎ̆		ʟ̆						

		BL	LD	D	A	PA	RF	P	V	U
Implosive	Voiced	ɓ			ɗ		ᶑ	ʄ	ɠ	ʛ
Implosive	Voiceless	ɓ̥			ɗ̥		ᶑ̊	ʄ̊	ɠ̊	ʛ̥
Ejective	Stop	pʼ			tʼ		ʈʼ	cʼ	kʼ	qʼ
Ejective	Affricate		p̪fʼ	t̪θʼ	tsʼ	t̠ʃʼ	tʂʼ	tɕʼ	kxʼ	qχʼ
Ejective	Fricative	ɸʼ	fʼ	θʼ	sʼ	ʃʼ	ʂʼ	ɕʼ	xʼ	χʼ
Ejective	Lateral affricate				tɬʼ			c𝼆ʼ	k𝼄ʼ	q𝼄ʼ
Ejective	Lateral fricative				ɬʼ					
Click (top: velar; bottom: uvular)	Tenuis	kʘ qʘ		kǀ qǀ	kǃ qǃ		k𝼊 q𝼊	kǂ qǂ		
Click (top: velar; bottom: uvular)	Voiced	ɡʘ ɢʘ		ɡǀ ɢǀ	ɡǃ ɢǃ		ɡ𝼊 ɢ𝼊	ɡǂ ɢǂ		
Click (top: velar; bottom: uvular)	Nasal	ŋʘ ɴʘ		ŋǀ ɴǀ	ŋǃ ɴǃ		ŋ𝼊 ɴ𝼊	ŋǂ ɴǂ	ʞ	
Click (top: velar; bottom: uvular)	Tenuis lateral				kǁ qǁ					
Click (top: velar; bottom: uvular)	Voiced lateral				ɡǁ ɢǁ					
Click (top: velar; bottom: uvular)	Nasal lateral				ŋǁ ɴǁ					
