= Dorig language =

Austronesian language spoken in Vanuatu

Dorig
- Dōrig
- Pronunciation: [ⁿdʊˈriɰ]
- Native to: Vanuatu
- Region: Gaua
- Native speakers: 300 (2012)
- Language family: Austronesian: Malayo-Polynesian; Oceanic; Southern Oceanic; North-Central Vanuatu; North Vanuatu; Torres-Banks; Dorig

Language codes
- ISO 639-3: wwo
- Glottolog: weta1242
- ELP: Dorig
- Dorig is classified as Definitely Endangered by the UNESCO Atlas of the World's Languages in Danger.

Dorig (formerly called Wetamut) is a threatened Oceanic language spoken on Gaua island in Vanuatu.

The language's 300 speakers live mostly in the village of Dorig [ⁿdʊˈriɰ], on the south coast of Gaua. Smaller speaker communities can be found in the villages of Qteon (east coast) and Qtevut (west coast).

Dorig's immediate neighbours are Koro and Mwerlap.

== Name ==
The name Dorig is derived from the name of the village where it is spoken.

== Phonology ==
Dorig has eight phonemic vowels. These include seven short monophthongs /i ɪ ɛ a ɔ ʊ u/ and one long vowel /aː/.

Dorig vowels
	Front	Back
Close	i ⟨i⟩	u ⟨u⟩
Near-close	ɪ ⟨ē⟩	ʊ ⟨ō⟩
Open-mid	ɛ ⟨e⟩	ɔ ⟨o⟩
Open	a ⟨a⟩, aː ⟨ā⟩	

Dorig has 15 consonant phonemes.

Dorig consonants
		Bilabial	Alveolar	Velar	Labiovelar
Nasal		m ⟨m⟩	n ⟨n⟩	ŋ ⟨n̄⟩	ŋ͡mʷ ⟨m̄⟩
Plosive	voiceless		t ⟨t⟩	k ⟨k⟩	k͡pʷ ⟨q⟩
Plosive	prenasal	ᵐb ⟨b⟩	ⁿd ⟨d⟩		
Fricative		ɸ ~ β ⟨v⟩	s ⟨s⟩	ɣ ⟨g⟩	
Trill			r ⟨r⟩		
Approximant			l ⟨l⟩		w ⟨w⟩

The phonotactic template for a syllable in Dorig is CCVC — e.g. /rk͡pʷa/ 'woman' (< *rVᵐbʷai); /ŋ͡mʷsar/ 'poor' (< *mʷasara); /wrɪt/ 'squid' (< *ɣurita). Remarkably, the consonant clusters of these /CCVC/ syllables are not constrained by the sonority sequencing principle. Historically, these CCVC syllables reflect former trisyllabic, paroxytone words *CVˈCVCV, after deletion of the two unstressed vowels: e.g. POc *kuRíta 'octopus' > *wərítə > /wrɪt/.

== Grammar ==
=== Basic syntax ===
Basic constituent order in Dorig is SVO.

The language has no copula (or verb be): its non-verbal predicates involve a direct juxtaposition {Subject | Predicate}.

=== Referential expressions ===
==== Pronouns ====
The system of personal pronouns in Dorig contrasts clusivity, and distinguishes four numbers (singular, dual, trial, plural).

==== Noun phrases ====
Dorig has four articles:

- i 'personal article' reserved to human nouns with high individuation such as proper names or kin terms;
- na 'common article' for common nouns that are inalienably possessed;
- o 'common article' for common nouns that are unbound;
- tuar 'indefinite article'.

=== Tense–Aspect–Mood and negation ===
The Dorig system of Tense–Aspect–Mood also incorporates the dimension of polarity (affirmation vs. negation), yielding a single “TAMP paradigm” (for “Tense-Aspect-Mood-Polarity”). That paradigm consists of 21 TAMP categories, e.g. Negative Potential (v)te-… late, positive Potential s(o)-… lala, (positive) Perfect m(e)-… The 14 TAMP positive morphemes come along 7 negative ones, a phenomenon known as paradigmatic asymmetry.

The seven negative TAMP markers of Dorig form part of a total of 16 grammatical constructions encoding negation.

=== Spatial reference ===
Spatial reference is based on a system of geocentric (absolute) directionals, which is typical of Oceanic languages.

== Bibliography ==
- François, Alexandre (2005), "Unraveling the history of the vowels of seventeen northern Vanuatu languages" (PDF), Oceanic Linguistics, 44 (2): 443–504, doi:10.1353/ol.2005.0034, S2CID 131668754
- —— (2010), "Phonotactics and the prestopped velar lateral of Hiw: Resolving the ambiguity of a complex segment" (PDF), Phonology, 27 (3): 393–434, doi:10.1017/s0952675710000205
- —— (2011), "Social ecology and language history in the northern Vanuatu linkage: A tale of divergence and convergence" (PDF), Journal of Historical Linguistics, 1 (2): 175–246, doi:10.1075/jhl.1.2.03fra, hdl:1885/29283
- —— (2012), "The dynamics of linguistic diversity: Egalitarian multilingualism and power imbalance among northern Vanuatu languages" (PDF), International Journal of the Sociology of Language, 214: 85–110, doi:10.1515/ijsl-2012-0022, S2CID 145208588
- —— (2015), "The ins and outs of up and down: Disentangling the nine geocentric space systems of Torres and Banks languages" (PDF), in Alexandre François; Sébastien Lacrampe; Michael Franjieh; Stefan Schnell (eds.), The languages of Vanuatu: Unity and diversity, Studies in the Languages of Island Melanesia, Canberra: Asia-Pacific Linguistics, pp. 137–195, hdl:1885/14819, ISBN 978-1-922185-23-5
- —— (2016), "The historical morphology of personal pronouns in northern Vanuatu" (PDF), in Pozdniakov, Konstantin (ed.), Comparatisme et reconstruction : tendances actuelles, Faits de Langues, vol. 47, Bern: Peter Lang, pp. 25–60
- —— (2022), "Presentation of the Dorig language, and audio archive", Pangloss Collection, Paris: CNRS
- —— (2026a), "Negation in Dorig" (PDF), in Matti Miestamo; Ljuba Veselinova (eds.), Negation in the World's Languages, Research on Comparative Grammar 9, vol. 3, Berlin: Language Science Press, pp. 73–128, doi:10.5281/zenodo.18234067
- —— (2026b), "Non-verbal predicates in Oceanic languages" (PDF), in Pier Marco Bertinetto; Luca Ciucci; Denis Creissels (eds.), Non-verbal Predication in the World’s Languages, vol. 2, Berlin: De Gruyter, pp. 1021–1066, doi:10.1515/9783112209677-029
