= Phonotactics =

Sounds allowed in a language (phonetics)

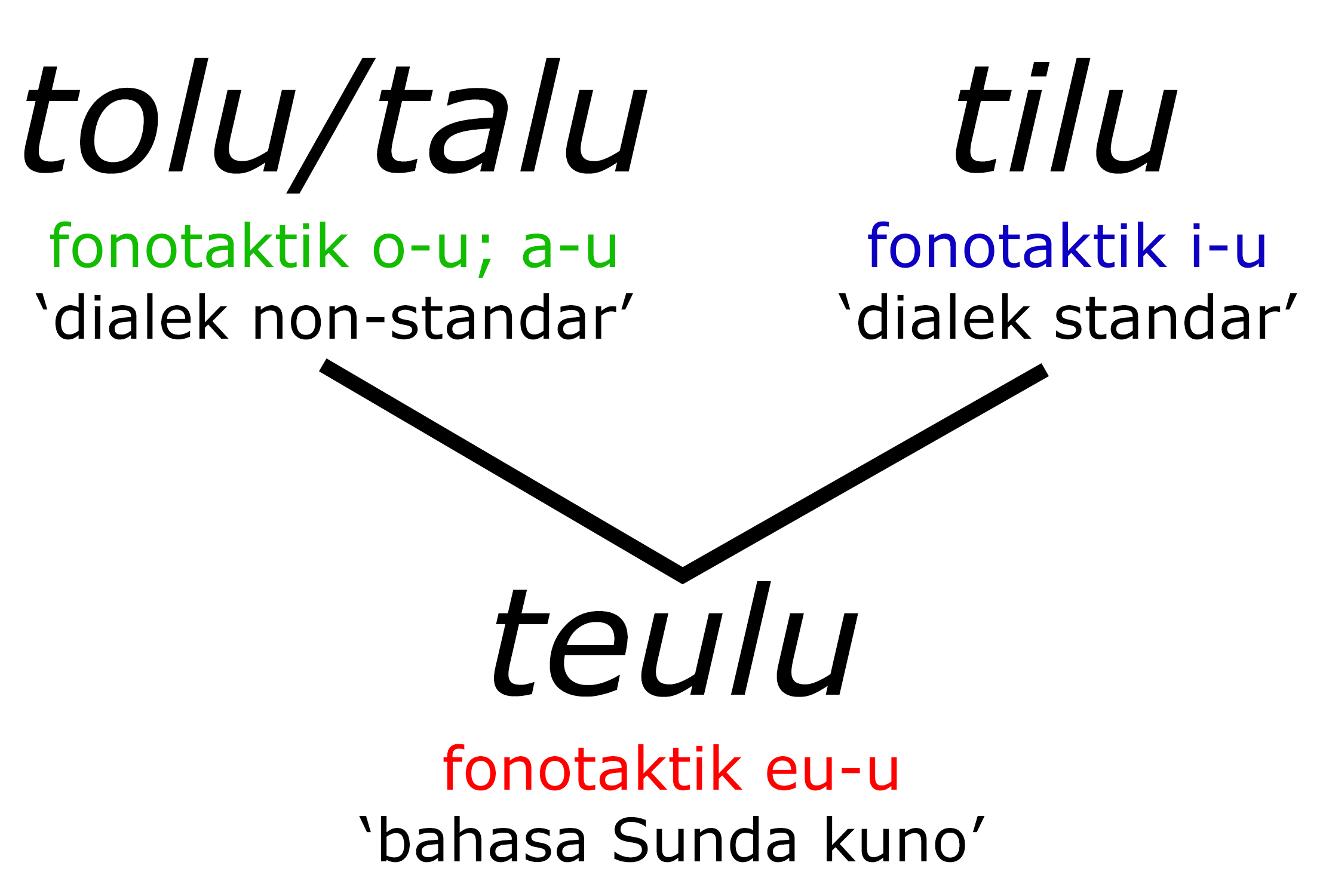
Example of phonotactic changes from Old Sundanese to Modern Sundanese.

Phonotactics (from Ancient Greek phōnḗ 'voice, sound' and taktikós 'having to do with arranging') is a branch of phonology that deals with restrictions in a language on the permissible combinations of phonemes. Phonotactics defines permissible syllable structure, consonant clusters and vowel sequences by means of phonotactic constraints.

Phonotactic constraints are highly language-specific. For example, in Japanese, consonant clusters like /rv/ do not occur. Similarly, the clusters /kn/ and /ɡn/ are not permitted at the beginning of a word in Modern English but are permitted in German and were permitted in Old and Middle English. In contrast, in some Slavic languages /l/ and /r/ are used alongside vowels as syllable nuclei.

Syllables have the following internal segmental structure:

- Onset (optional)
- Rhyme (obligatory, comprises nucleus and coda):
  - Nucleus (obligatory)
  - Coda (optional)

Both onset and coda may be empty, forming a vowel-only syllable, or alternatively, the nucleus can be occupied by a syllabic consonant. Phonotactics is known to affect second language vocabulary acquisition.

== Sonority sequencing principle ==
Segments of a syllable are universally distributed following the sonority sequencing principle (SSP), which states that, in any syllable, the nucleus has maximal sonority and that sonority decreases as you move away from the nucleus. Sonority is a measure of the amplitude of a speech sound. The particular ranking of each speech sound by sonority, called the sonority hierarchy, is language-specific, but, in its broad lines, hardly varies from a language to another, which means all languages form their syllables in approximately the same way with regards to sonority.

To illustrate the SSP, the voiceless alveolar fricative [s] is lower on the sonority hierarchy than the alveolar lateral approximant [l], so the combination /sl/ is permitted in onsets and /ls/ is permitted in codas, but /ls/ is not allowed in onsets and /sl/ is not allowed in codas. Hence slips /slɪps/ and pulse /pʌls/ are possible English words while *lsips and *pusl are not.

The SSP expresses a very strong cross-linguistic tendency, however, it does not account for the patterns of all complex syllable margins, as there are both initial as well as final clusters in violation of the SSP in two ways: the first occurs when two segments in a margin have the same sonority, which is known as a sonority plateau. Such margins are found in a few languages, including English, as in the words sphinx and fact (though note that phsinx and fatc both violate English phonotactics).

The second instance of violation of the SSP is when a peripheral segment of a margin has a higher sonority than a segment closer to the nucleus. These margins are known as reversals and occur in some languages including English (steal [stiːɫ], bets /bɛts/) or French (dextre /dɛkstʁ/ but originally /dɛkstʁə/, strict /stʁikt/).

== Examples ==
=== English ===
The English syllable (and word) twelfths /twɛlfθs/ is divided into the onset /tw/, the nucleus /ɛ/ and the coda /lfθs/; thus, it can be described as CCVCCCC (C = consonant, V = vowel). On this basis it is possible to form rules for which representations of phoneme classes may fill the cluster. For instance, English allows at most three consonants in an onset, but among native words under standard accents (and excluding a few obscure loanwords such as sphragistics), phonemes in a three-consonantal onset are limited to the following scheme:

/s/ + stop + approximant:
- /s/ + /t/ + /r/

- strap

- /s/ + /t/ + /j/ (not in most accents of American English)

- stew

- /s/ + /p/ + /j r l/

- sputum
- sprawl
- splat

- /s/ + /k/ + /j r l w/

- skew
- scream
- sclerosis
- squirrel

This constraint can be observed in the pronunciation of the word blue: originally, the vowel of blue was identical to the vowel of cue, approximately [iw]. In most dialects of English, [iw] shifted to [juː]. Theoretically, this would produce *[bljuː]. The cluster [blj], however, infringes the constraint for three-consonantal onsets in English. Therefore, the pronunciation has been reduced to [bluː] by elision of the [j] in what is known as yod-dropping.

Not all languages have this constraint; compare Spanish pliegue [ˈpljeɣe] or French pluie [plɥi].

Constraints on English phonotactics include:

- All syllables have a nucleus
- No geminate consonants
- No onset /ŋ/
- No /h/ in the syllable coda (except in Hiberno-English)
- No affricates in complex onsets (except when underlying /tr/ and /dr/ are analysed as /tʃr/ and /dʒr/)
- No /h/ in complex onsets
- The first consonant in a complex onset must be an obstruent (e.g. stop; combinations such as *ntat or *rkoop, with a sonorant, are not allowed)
- The second consonant in a complex onset must not be a voiced obstruent (e.g. *zdop does not occur)
- If the first consonant in a complex onset is not /s/, the second must be a liquid or a glide
- Every subsequence contained within a sequence of consonants must obey all the relevant phonotactic rules (the substring principle rule)
- No glides in syllable codas (excluding the offglides of diphthongs)
- The second consonant in a complex coda must not be /r/, /ŋ/, /ʒ/, or /ð/ (compare asthma, typically pronounced /ˈæzmə/ or /ˈæsmə/, but rarely /ˈæzðmə/)
- If the second consonant in a complex coda is voiced, so is the first

=== Ancient Greek ===
Like English and some other Indo-European languages, Ancient Greek allowed onset clusters beginning in [s] which violate the SSP, such as στάδιον (stadion) or σφραγίς (sphragis: note that φ was originally pronounced [pʰ]). Ancient Greek also included initial consonant clusters such as [pt] in Πτολεμαῖος (Ptolemy) and [bd] in βδέλλιον (bdellion): unlike their borrowed versions in English, all the consonants were pronounced.

== Notes and reference ==
=== References ===
- Bailey, Todd M.; Hahn, Ulrike (May 2001). "Determinants of Wordlikeness: Phonotactics or Lexical Neighborhoods?". Journal of Memory and Language. 44 (4): 568–591. doi:10.1006/jmla.2000.2756.
- Coleman, John; Pierrehumbert, Janet (1997). "Stochastic phonological grammars and acceptability". arXiv:cmp-lg/9707017.
- Frisch, Stefan A.; Large, Nathan R.; Pisoni, David B. (May 2000). "Perception of Wordlikeness: Effects of Segment Probability and Length on the Processing of Nonwords". Journal of Memory and Language. 42 (4): 481–496. doi:10.1006/jmla.1999.2692. PMC 3129706. PMID 21738287.
- Gathercole, Susan E.; Martin, Amanda J. (2013). "Interactive processes in phonological memory". In Gathercole, Susan E. (ed.). Models of Short-Term Memory. pp. 73–100. doi:10.4324/9780203775868. ISBN 978-1-134-83482-2.
- Hammond, Michael (2004). "Gradience, phonotactics and the lexicon in English phonology". International Journal of English Studies. 4 (2): 1–24. hdl:10201/2178.
- Gaygen, Daniel E.; Luce, Paul A. (1997). "Effects of phonotactic probability on segmentation of words in continuous speech". The Journal of the Acoustical Society of America. 101 (5_Supplement): 3154. Bibcode:1997ASAJ..101Q3154G. doi:10.1121/1.419081.
- Greenberg, Joseph H.; Jenkins, James J. (April 1966). "Studies in the Psychological Correlates of the Sound System of American English". Word. 22 (1–3): 207–242. doi:10.1080/00437956.1966.11435451.
- Goldstein, David (2013). "Phonotactics". In Giannakis, Georgios K. (ed.). Encyclopedia of Ancient Greek Language and Linguistics Online. Brill. doi:10.1163/2214-448X_eagll_SIM_00000474.
- Laufer, Batia (2016). "What's in a word that makes it hard or easy: Some intralexical factors that affect the learning of words". In Webb, Stuart (ed.). Vocabulary. pp. 199–215. doi:10.4324/9781003763697. ISBN 978-1-003-76369-7.
- Luce, Paul A.; Pisoni, David B. (February 1998). "Recognizing Spoken Words: The Neighborhood Activation Model". Ear and Hearing. 19 (1): 1–36. doi:10.1097/00003446-199802000-00001. PMC 3467695. PMID 9504270.
- Newman, Rochelle S.; Sawusch, James R.; Luce, Paul A. (1997). "Lexical neighborhood effects in phonetic processing". Journal of Experimental Psychology: Human Perception and Performance. 23 (3): 873–889. doi:10.1037/0096-1523.23.3.873. PMID 9180048. ProQuest 614320924.
- Ohala, John J.; Ohala, M. (1986). "Testing hypotheses regarding the psychological manifestation of morpheme structure constraints". In Ohala, John J.; Jaeger, Jeri J. (eds.). Experimental phonology. Orlando, FL: Academic Press. pp. 239–252.
- Orzechowska, Paula; Wiese, Richard (January 2015). "Preferences and variation in word-initial phonotactics: A multi-dimensional evaluation of German and Polish". Folia Linguistica. 49 (2). doi:10.1515/flin-2015-0016.
- Pitt, Mark A.; McQueen, James M. (October 1998). "Is Compensation for Coarticulation Mediated by the Lexicon?". Journal of Memory and Language. 39 (3): 347–370. doi:10.1006/jmla.1998.2571.
- Storkel, Holly L.; Armbruster, Jonna; Hogan, Tiffany P. (December 2006). "Differentiating phonotactic probability and neighborhood density in adult word learning". Journal of Speech, Language, and Hearing Research. 49 (6): 1175–1193. doi:10.1044/1092-4388(2006/085). PMC 2850108. PMID 17197489. Gale A158526307.
- Storkel, Holly L. (December 2003). "Learning New Words II: Phonotactic Probability in Verb Learning". Journal of Speech, Language, and Hearing Research. 46 (6): 1312–1323. doi:10.1044/1092-4388(2003/102). hdl:1808/20321. PMID 14700357.
- Vitevitch, Michael S.; Luce, Paul A. (July 1998). "When Words Compete: Levels of Processing in Perception of Spoken Words". Psychological Science. 9 (4): 325–329. doi:10.1111/1467-9280.00064. JSTOR 40063346.
- Vitevitch, Michael S.; Luce, Paul A. (April 1999). "Probabilistic Phonotactics and Neighborhood Activation in Spoken Word Recognition". Journal of Memory and Language. 40 (3): 374–408. doi:10.1006/jmla.1998.2618.
- Vitevitch, Michael S.; Luce, Paul A.; Charles-Luce, Jan; Kemmerer, David (January 1997). "Phonotactics and Syllable Stress: Implications for the Processing of Spoken Nonsense Words". Language and Speech. 40 (1): 47–62. doi:10.1177/002383099704000103. PMID 9230698.
- Vitevitch, Michael S.; Luce, Paul A.; Pisoni, David B.; Auer, Edward T. (June 1999). "Phonotactics, Neighborhood Activation, and Lexical Access for Spoken Words". Brain and Language. 68 (1–2): 306–311. doi:10.1006/brln.1999.2116. PMC 3466467. PMID 10433774.
