= Sonority sequencing principle =

Phonological principle observed in many languages

The sonority sequencing principle (SSP), or sonority sequencing constraint, is a phonotactic principle that aims to explain or predict the structure of a syllable in terms of sonority.

== Definition ==
The SSP states that the syllable nucleus (syllable center), often a vowel, constitutes a sonority peak that is preceded and/or followed by a sequence of segments, consonants, with progressively decreasing sonority values (the sonority must fall toward both edges of the syllable). The sonority values of segments are determined by a sonority hierarchy but differ to some extent by language. Typically, they are vowel > glide > liquid > nasal > obstruent (or > fricative > plosive > click). That is, the segment order in a syllable tends to be of the pattern Ʞ-P-F-N-L-G-V-G-L-N-F-P. The fricative–plosive and nasal–plosive rankings may be reversed. Wright (2004: 51–52) notes:

In a Sonority Sequencing Constraint that is based on perceptual robustness, a stranded consonant (one without a flanking vowel, liquid, or glide) is dispreferred unless it has sufficiently robust internal cues to survive in the absence of formant transitions. ... Segments that we expect to survive without the benefits of flanking vowels, and thus be found at syllable edges with intervening stops, are the sibilant fricatives, potentially other fricatives ... and nasals.

== Examples ==
An example of the SSP in English is the one-syllable word trust. The first consonant in the syllable onset is t, which is a stop, the lowest on the sonority scale; next is r, a liquid which is more sonorous; then is the vowel u /ʌ/, the sonority peak; next, in the syllable coda, is s, a sibilant; and finally is another stop, t. The SSP explains why, for example, trend is a valid English word but not *rtedn , which would reverse the order of the consonants. Language processing has also been shown experimentally to be sensitive to sonority violations.

Some languages such as Russian and dialectal Arabic have syllables that violate the SSP, and other languages strictly adhere to it and even require larger intervals on the sonority scale. In Italian, for example, a syllable-initial stop must be followed by a liquid, a glide or a vowel, not a fricative (except [ps] in borrowed words like pseudonimo and psicologia). Some languages like Modern Hebrew allow a sonority "plateau"; two adjacent tautosyllabic consonants with the same sonority level.

A number of Indo-European languages that typically follow the SSP violate it with /s/ + stop clusters. For example, in English string and Italian spago, the more sonorous /s/ comes before a less sonorous sound in the onset. In native English words, no phoneme other than /s/ ever violates the SSP. Latin violated the principle in this way, but the Vulgar Latin dialects that evolved into the Western Romance languages lost this ability, which caused the process of I-prosthesis to occur, whereby an /i/ was inserted at the beginning of such a word, to make the /s/ instead a coda consonant, rather than an onset consonant. As a result, Western Romance languages like Spanish and French have espada and épée (from espee) respectively, and a non-Western Romance language like Italian has spada and even words such as sdraio 'deck-chair' (pronounced /'zdra.jo/).

However, all of those sonority violations noted occur at the beginning or the end of words, not their middle. Therefore, some recent phonological accounts postulate that the segments outside the sonority sequencing may be considered "extrasyllabic consonants", consonants that occur outside any syllable and are allowed in their language by the word in which they are. English string, for example, then contains a syllable [tring] with a preceding extrasyllabic s.

Certain languages such as Dorig violate the SSP completely. Examples in Dorig are rqa [rk͡pʷa] 'woman', m̄sar [ŋ͡mʷsar] 'poor', and wrēt [wrɪt] 'squid'.

== See also ==
- Sonority hierarchy
