= Lizu language =

Qiangic language spoken in China

Lizu
- Native to: China
- Native speakers: 7,000 (2008)
- Language family: Sino-Tibetan: Qiangic; Ersuic; Lizu
- Writing system: Ersu Shaba script

Language codes
- ISO 639-3: None (mis)
- Glottolog: lizu1234
- ELP: Lizu

Monophthongs of Lizu, from Chirkova & Chen (2013:78)

Lizu (Chinese: 傈苏, 里汝, 吕苏; Western Ersu) is a Qiangic language spoken in Western Sichuan, China. There are 4,000 speakers according to Sun (1982) and 7,000 speakers according to Chirkova (2008). Muli, where Lizu is spoken, is a multi-ethnic and multi-lingual county and Lizu has been historically influenced by Mandarin Chinese.

== Varieties ==
Yu (2009: 2) lists the following varieties of Lizu:

- Mianning Lizu: spoken in Lagusa 拉姑萨 Village (Lizu name `wontʂʰɨ `lombɑ), He’ai (“Hoŋai”) 和爱 Township, Mianning County 冕宁, Liangshan 凉山 Prefecture. Documented by Yu (2012).
- Kala Lizu: spoken in Kala 卡拉 Township, Muli County 木里, Liangshan Prefecture. Documented by Chirkova (2008); Huáng and Rénzēng (1991); and Dài and Huáng (1992).
- Naiqu Lizu: spoken in Naiqu 乃渠 Village, Naiqu Township, Jiulong County 九龙, Garzê (Gānzī 甘孜) Prefecture. Documented by Ikeda (2009).

== Phonology ==
=== Consonants ===
Lizu stops and affricates have a three-way distinction, aspirated, voiceless, and voiced.

		Bilabial	Alveolar		Post-alveolar	Alveolo-palatal	Velar	Uvular	Glottal
		Bilabial	plain	sibilant	Post-alveolar	Alveolo-palatal	Velar	Uvular	Glottal
Nasal		m	n			ɲ	ŋ		
Stop/ Affricate	aspirated	pʰ	tʰ	tsʰ	tʃʰ	tɕʰ	kʰ	qʰ	
Stop/ Affricate	voiceless	p	t	ts	tʃ	tɕ	k	q	ʔ
Stop/ Affricate	voiced	b	d	dz	dʒ	dʑ	g		
Fricative	voiceless		ɬ	s	ʃ	ɕ	x		h
Fricative	voiced			z	ʒ	ʑ	ɣ		
Approximant	median	w	ɹ			j			
Approximant	lateral		l						

Velar and uvular stops only contrast before /o/, and are in complementary distribution otherwise. Similarly, /n/ and /ɲ/ only contrast before /æ e o/.

Nasalization occurs in words beginning with glottal consonants, which is an areal feature, and is common in Ngwi languages such as Lahu.

==== Consonant clusters ====
Consonant clusters are prominent in Lizu, and often contain bilabials or laterals. /j/ occurs after bilabials and laterals, and occurs before /æ e/ after bilabial plosives, and before /e o/ after laterals, such as in /^{EP}kʰoljo/ "amulet box" and /^{RP}bje-bje/ "thick, coarse" respectively. /w/ occurs after postalveolars, velars, uvulars, velar and glottal fricatives, and /ɹ/, such as /^{R}ʃwɐ/ "mosquito", /^{RP}qwɐ-qwɐ/ "hard", /^{R}xwɐ/ "bird", /^{EP}hwæ-se/ "Maple (Acer spp.)", and /^{LP}ɹwæ-ɹwæ/ "noisy". /ɹ/ typically occurs after bilabials and glottal fricatives before /æ/ and /ə/, for example /^{LP}pɹə-pɹə/ "spider" and /^{R}hɹɐ/ "to obtain". /b/ permits /ʑ z/ following it, before front vowels and /ɐ/ respectively, as in /^{F}bʑe/ "to fly; pleasant" /^{EP}ɲibzɐ/ "green". /ʑ/ also occurs after /p/, along with /ɕ/ and /ʃ/, such as in /^{RP}de-pʑæ/ "to hang", /^{F}pɕi/ "to throw", /^{F}pʃə/ "Tibetan". /ptsʰ/ is also found before low vowels, such as in /^{RP}kʰe-ptsʰæ/ "to taste".

Prenasalized clusters also occur, involving voiced and aspirated stops and affricates. The place of articulation for the nasal is homorganic with the following consonant, and is thus represented with /N/. They are also contrastive, as can be observed in /^{F}ge/ "wolf" as opposed to /^{F}Nge/ "nine", and /^{R}tʃʰæ/ "ghost" against /^{R}Ntʃʰæ/ "skirt". Prenasalized clusters are also found in loanwords from Tibetan and Chinese, due to a resyllabification process wherein the nasal coda joins the onset. The preceding vowel is also audibly nasalized, such as in /^{EP}kuNtsʰe/ [^{REP}kũntsʰe] "coffin" from Southwest Mandarin 棺材 /kuan^{44}tsʰai^{21}/. Occasionally the nasal is entirely dropped, such as /^{RP}jɐy/ [^{RP}jɐɥy] "potato" from Southwest Mandarin 洋芋 /iaŋ^{21}y^{213}/.

=== Vowels ===
		Front	Central	Back
Close	unrounded	i		
Close	rounded	y		u
Mid		e	ə	o
Open		æ	ɐ	

The Luzi vowel system consists of 8 monophthongs, and diphthongs are only found in loanwords from Southwest Mandarin (such as /^{RP}ʃətsai/ "really" from 实在 /ʂʅ^{21}tsai^{213}/). /u/ is somewhat centralized and is produced with higher lip compression, and is realized as [ʙ̩] after alveolar and bilabial stop initials. This is a common areal phenomenon, and can be found in many neighboring languages, including Nuosu, Yongning Na, and Namuzi. Unlike Nuosu however, where only one side of the lip is trilled, in Luzi both lips vibrate to produce the trill.

Luzi also features an additional set of nasalized vowels from Tibetan and Mandarin loanwords, which is different from nasalization triggered by glottal consonants, but is generally considered subphonemic.

=== Tone ===
Similar to other Western Tibeto-Burman languages in Sichuan and Yunnan, Lizu has a sparse tone system, where only one pitch pattern is pronounced in a word. Monosyllabic words have two contrasting tones, low rising (R) and high falling (F), minimal pairs include /^{R}ne/ "two" and /^{F}ne/ "you, thou".

Disyllabic words have three contrasting tones, equally-prominent contour (EP), where both syllables are equally prominent and long, and both syllables have a mid-pitch contour, however the first syllable is slightly higher. There is also left-prominent contour (LP), where the last syllable is shorter and less prominent, the pitch peaks in the first syllable before falling which continues through the second syllable. This is contrasted with right-prominent contour (RP), where the last syllable is relatively longer and there is a rise in the first syllable before peaking in the second syllable and then falling.

Trisyllabic and tetrasyllabic words feature the same three patterns comparable to those found in disyllabic words, with minimal differences. Multisyllabic words also have a prominence difference between syllables, akin to stress patterns in Germanic languages.

==== Sandhi in compounds ====
Tonal sandhi is also observed in compound words, namely in tri- and tetrasyllabic words, as disyllabic compounds have been largely lexicalized. Compounds largely take the tone of the initial word, which can be seen in /^{RP}ɹwæ meNtʃʰo/ "chicken tail" derived from /^{R}ɹwæ/ "chicken" and /^{LP}meNtʃʰo/ "tail".
