= Mianning =

Mianning may refer to:

- Mianning County, a county in Liangshan Yi Autonomous Prefecture, Sichuan, China.
- Daoguang Emperor (1782–1850), named Mianning, emperor of the Qing Dynasty
- Mianning (緬甯), another name for Lincang, Yunnan, China
