= Neoserica ningyuanensis =

Scientific classification
- Kingdom: Animalia
- Phylum: Arthropoda
- Class: Insecta
- Order: Coleoptera
- Suborder: Polyphaga
- Infraorder: Scarabaeiformia
- Family: Scarabaeidae
- Genus: Neoserica
- Species: N. ningyuanensis

Binomial name
- Neoserica ningyuanensis Ahrens, Fabrizi & Liu, 2014

Species of beetle

Neoserica ningyuanensis is a species of beetle of the family Scarabaeidae. It is found in Sichuan and Yunnan, China.

== Description ==
Adults reach a length of about 9.4–9.5 mm. They have a dark reddish brown, oblong body. The antennae are yellow and the dorsal surface is dull and nearly glabrous.

== Etymology ==
The species is named after its type locality, Ningyuan in Mianning County, Sichuan.
