= Tosu language =

Qiangic language of China

Tosu
- Native to: China
- Native speakers: few to none (2012)
- Language family: Sino-Tibetan: Qiangic; Ersuic; Tosu

Language codes
- ISO 639-3: included in Ersu [ers]
- Glottolog: tosu1234
- ELP: Duoxu

Tosu (Chinese: 多续; pinyin: Duōxù; autonym: do33ɕu33 na31) is a moribund Qiangic language of China which shows strong affiliations to both the Loloish languages and to Tangut, the language of the Western Xia. Yu (2012) classifies it as an Ersuic language, which belongs to the Qiangic branch. There are "almost no Tosu speakers left", or "practically" no Ersu speakers left.

About 2,000 Tosu people live in Miǎnníng county and the villages around it, as well as in six outlying townships of that county, namely Hòushān (后山), Fùxīng (复兴), Huì’ān (惠安), Hāhā (哈哈), Línlǐ (林里), and Shābā town (沙坝镇). Chirkova (2014) reports that it is spoken by more than 9 individuals, all in their seventies and eighties.

== Bibliography ==
- Yu, Dominic. 2012. Proto-Ersuic. Ph.D. dissertation. Berkeley: University of California, Berkeley, Department of Linguistics.
- Nishida, Tatsuo, 1973, 多続訳語の研究 : 新言語トス語の構造と系統 [A Study of the Tosu–Chinese Vocabulary Tosu I-yu: the structure and lineage of Tosu, a new language], 松香堂 Shokado, Kyoto (in Japanese)
- Nishida, Tatsuo, 1975, "Hsi-hsia, Tosu, and Lolo–Burmese", Sino-Tibetan Conference VIII, Berkeley
- Nishida, Tatsuo, 1976, "Hsi-hsia, Tosu, and Lolo–Burmese languages", Studia Phonologica 10:1–15
- Hán Zhèngkāng; Yuán Xiǎowén; [Hé] Qí Kǎjiā [韩正康，袁晓文，[荷] 齐卡佳] (2019). Sìchuān Miǎnníng Duōxùhuà [四川冕宁多续话]. Beijing: Commercial Press [商务印书馆].
