= Lizu =

Lizu is an atonal pinyin romanization of various Chinese names.

It may refer to:

- Li people (黎族, Lízú), also known as the Hlai, on Hainan
- Lizu language, properly Lisu (傈苏, Lìsū) and also known as Eastern Ersu, spoken in Sichuan
