= Consonant cluster =

Group of consonants without a vowel in between

In linguistics, a consonant cluster, consonant sequence or consonant compound is a group of consonants which have no intervening vowel. In English, for example, the groups /spl/ and /ts/ are consonant clusters in the word splits. In the education field it is variously called a consonant cluster or a consonant blend.

There is disagreement among linguists as to whether the term can be properly applied only to consonant clusters that occur within one syllable, or if the concept is more useful when it includes consonant sequences across syllable boundaries. According to the former definition, the longest consonant clusters in the word extra would be /ks/ and /tr/, whereas the latter allows /kstr/, which is phonetically [kst̠ɹ̠̊˔ʷ] in some accents.

== Phonotactics ==
Each language has an associated set of phonotactic constraints. Languages' phonotactics differ as to what consonant clusters they permit. Many languages are more restrictive than English in terms of consonant clusters, and some forbid consonant clusters entirely.

For example, Hawaiian, like most Oceanic languages, forbids consonant clusters entirely. Japanese is almost as strict, but allows a sequence of a nasal consonant plus another consonant, as in Honshū [hoꜜɰ̃ɕɯː] (the name of the largest island of Japan). It also permits geminate /pp tt kk ss/. However, palatalized consonants, such as [kʲ] in Tōkyō [toːkʲoː], are single consonants.

Standard Arabic forbids initial consonant clusters and more than two consecutive consonants in other positions, as do most other Semitic languages, although Modern Israeli Hebrew permits initial two-consonant clusters, e.g. pkak 'cap'; dlaat 'pumpkin', and Moroccan Arabic, under Berber influence, allows strings of several consonants. (Note: The extent of consonant clusters in Moroccan Arabic depends on the analysis. Richard Harrell's grammar of the language postulates schwa sounds in many positions that do not occur in other analyses. For example, the word that appears as ktbu 'they wrote' in Jeffrey Heath's Ablaut and Ambiguity: Phonology of a Moroccan Arabic Dialect appears as ketbu in Harrell's grammar.)

Like most Mon–Khmer languages, Khmer permits only initial consonant clusters with up to three consonants in a row per syllable. Finnish has initial consonant clusters natively only on South-Western dialects and on foreign loans, and only clusters of three inside the word are allowed. Most spoken languages and dialects, however, are more permissive. In Burmese, consonant clusters of only up to three consonants (the initial and two medials— two written forms of /-j-/, /-w-/) at the initial onset are allowed in writing and only two (the initial and one medial) are pronounced; these clusters are restricted to certain letters. Some Burmese dialects allow for clusters of up to four consonants (with the addition of the /-l-/ medial, which can combine with the above-mentioned medials).

At the other end of the scale, the Kartvelian languages of Georgia are drastically more permissive of consonant clustering. Clusters in Georgian of four, five or six consonants are not unusual—for instance, ბრტყელი /brtʼqʼɛli/ 'flat', მწვრთნელი /mt͡sʼvrtnɛli/ 'trainer' and ფრცქვნა /prt͡skvna/ 'peeling'—and if grammatical affixes are used, it allows an eight-consonant cluster: გვბრდღვნის /ɡvbrdɣvnis/ 'he's plucking us', გვფრცქვნი /gvprt͡skvni/ 'you peel us'. Consonants cannot appear as syllable nuclei in Georgian, so this syllable is analysed as CCCCCCCCVC.

Many Slavic languages may manifest almost as formidable numbers of consecutive consonants, such as in the Czech tongue twister strč prst skrz krk (pronounced [str̩tʃ pr̩st skr̩s kr̩k]), meaning 'stick a finger through the neck', the Slovak words štvrť /ʃtvr̩c/ 'quarter', and žblnknutie /ʒbl̩ŋknucɪɛ̯/ 'clunk; flop', and the Slovene word skrbstvo /skrbstʋo/ 'welfare'. However, the liquid consonants /r/ and /l/ can form syllable nuclei in West and South Slavic languages and behave phonologically as vowels in this case.

An example of a true initial cluster is the Polish word wszczniesz /fʂt͡ʂɲɛʂ/ 'you will initiate'. In the Serbo-Croatian word opskrbljivanje /ɔpskr̩bʎiʋaɲɛ/ 'victualling' the ⟨lj⟩ and ⟨nj⟩ are digraphs representing single consonants: [ʎ] and [ɲ], respectively. In Dutch, clusters of six or even seven consonants are possible, e.g. angstschreeuw 'a scream of fear', slechtstschrijvend 'writing the worst' and zachtstschrijdend 'treading the most softly'.

Nuxalk (Salishan), Oowekyala (Wakashan), Ōgami (Ryukyuan) and Shilha (Berber) allow obstruents to behave as syllable nuclei in normal vocabulary. Notably, Nuxalk and Oowekyala have words, phrases and entire sentences lacking phonemic and phonetic sonorants, e.g. Nuxalk pʼxwlhtlhp /pʼχʷɬtɬp/ [pʼχʷɬt(ʰ)ɬpʰ] 'bunchberry plant', kʼclhhtscw slhxwtlhhts /cʼçɬːt͡sxʷ sɬχʷtɬːt͡s/ [cʼçɬːt͡sxʷ sɬχʷt(ʰ)ɬːt͡s] 'you had seen me go through the passage'.

There has been a trend to reduce and simplify consonant clusters in the Mainland Southeast Asia linguistic area, such as Chinese and Vietnamese. Old Chinese was known to contain additional medials such as /r/ and/or /l/, which yielded retroflexion in Middle Chinese and today's Mandarin Chinese. The word 江, read /tɕiɑŋ˥/ in Mandarin and /kɔːŋ˥⁻˥˧/ in Cantonese, is reconstructed as *klong or *krung in Old Chinese by Sinologists like Zhengzhang Shangfang, William H. Baxter, and Laurent Sagart. Additionally, initial clusters such as "tk" and "sn" were analysed in recent reconstructions of Old Chinese, and some were developed as palatalised sibilants. Similarly, in Thai, words with initial consonant clusters are commonly reduced in colloquial speech to pronounce only the initial consonant, such as the pronunciation of the word ครับ reducing from /kʰrap̚˦˥/ to /kʰap̚˦˥/.

Another element of consonant clusters in Old Chinese was analysed in coda and post-coda position. Some "departing tone" syllables have cognates in the "entering tone" syllables, which feature a -p, -t, -k in Middle Chinese and Southern Chinese varieties. The departing tone was analysed to feature a post-coda sibilant, "s". Clusters of -ps, -ts, -ks, were then formed at the end of syllables. These clusters eventually collapsed into "-ts" or "-s", before disappearing altogether, leaving elements of diphthongisation in more modern varieties. Old Vietnamese also had a rich inventory of initial clusters, but these were slowly merged with plain initials during Middle Vietnamese, and some have developed into the palatal nasal.

== Origin ==
Some consonant clusters originate from the loss of a vowel in between two consonants, usually (but not always) due to vowel reduction caused by lack of stress. This is also the origin of most consonant clusters in English, some of which go back to Proto-Indo-European times. For example, ⟨glow⟩ comes from Proto-Germanic *glo-, which in turn comes from Proto-Indo-European *gʰel-ó, where *gʰel- is a root meaning 'to shine, to be bright' and is also present in ⟨glee⟩, ⟨gleam⟩, and ⟨glade⟩.

Consonant clusters can also originate from assimilation of a consonant with a vowel. In many Slavic languages, the combination mji, mje, mja etc. regularly gave mlji, mlje, mja etc. Compare Russian zemlyá, which had this change, with Polish ziemia, which lacks the change, both from Proto-Balto-Slavic *źemē. See Proto-Slavic language and History of Proto-Slavic for more information about this change.

== Clusters in languages ==
All languages differ in syllable structure and cluster template. A loanword from Adyghe in the extinct Ubykh language, psta ('to well up'), violates Ubykh's limit of two initial consonants. The English words sphere /ˈsfɪər/ and sphinx /ˈsfɪŋks/, Greek loanwords, break the rule that two fricatives may not appear adjacently at the beginning of words. Some English words, including thrash, three, throat, and throw, start with the voiceless dental fricative /θ/, the liquid /r/, or the /r/ cluster (/θ/+/r/). The example of clusters in Proto-Germanic has a counterpart in which /θ/ was followed by /l/. In early North and West Germanic, the /l/ cluster disappeared. That suggests that clusters are affected as words are loaned to other languages. The examples show that every language has syllable preference based on syllable structure and segment harmony of the language.

Other factors that affect clusters loaned to other languages include speech rate, articulatory factors, and speech perceptivity. Bayley has added that social factors such as age, gender, and geographical locations of speakers can determine clusters when they are loaned crosslinguistically.

== English ==
In English, the longest possible initial cluster is three consonants, as in split /ˈsplɪt/, strudel /ˈstruːdəl/, strengths /ˈstrɛŋkθs/, and "squirrel" /ˈskwɪrəl/, all beginning with /s/ or /ʃ/, containing /p/, /t/, or /k/, and ending with /l/, /r/, or /w/ (Note: If the ⟨ew⟩ /juː/ is thought of as consonant and vowel, rather than as a diphthong, three-consonant clusters also occur in words such as skew /ˈskjuː/); the longest possible final cluster is five consonants, as in angsts (/ˈæŋksts/), though this is rare (perhaps owing to being derived from a recent German loanword). However, the /k/ in angsts may also be considered epenthetic; for many speakers, nasal-sibilant sequences in the coda require insertion of a voiceless stop homorganic to the nasal. For speakers without this feature, the word is pronounced without the /k/. Final clusters of four consonants, as in angsts in other dialects (/ˈæŋsts/), twelfths /ˈtwɛlfθs/, sixths /ˈsɪksθs/, bursts /ˈbɜːrsts/ (in rhotic accents) and glimpsed /ˈɡlɪmpst/, are more common. Within compound words, clusters of five consonants or more are possible (if cross-syllabic clusters are accepted), as in handspring /ˈhændsprɪŋ/ and in the Yorkshire place-name of Hampsthwaite /hæmpsθweɪt/.

It is important to distinguish clusters and digraphs. Clusters are made of two or more consonant sounds, while a digraph is a group of two consonant letters standing for a single sound. For example, in the word ship, the two letters of the digraph ⟨sh⟩ together represent the single consonant [ʃ]. Conversely, the letter ⟨x⟩ can produce the consonant clusters /ks/ (annex), /gz/ (exist), /kʃ/ (sexual), or /gʒ/ (some pronunciations of "luxury"). It is worth noting that ⟨x⟩ often produces sounds in two different syllables (following the general principle of saturating the subsequent syllable before assigning sounds to the preceding syllable). Also note a combination digraph and cluster as seen in length with two digraphs ⟨ng⟩, ⟨th⟩ representing a cluster of two consonants: /ŋθ/ (although it may be pronounced /ŋkθ/ instead, as ⟨ng⟩ followed by a voiceless consonant in the same syllable often does); lights with a silent digraph ⟨gh⟩ followed by a cluster ⟨t⟩, ⟨s⟩: /ts/; and compound words such as sightscreen /ˈsaɪtskriːn/ or catchphrase /ˈkætʃfreɪz/.

== Frequency ==
Not all consonant clusters are distributed equally among the languages of the world. Consonant clusters have a tendency to fall under patterns such as the sonority sequencing principle (SSP); the closer a consonant in a cluster is to the syllable's vowel, the more sonorous the consonant is. Among the most common types of clusters are initial stop-liquid sequences, such as in Thai (e.g. /pʰl/, /tr/, and /kl/). Other common ones include initial stop-approximant (e.g. Thai /kw/) and initial fricative-liquid (e.g. English /sl/) sequences. More rare are sequences which defy the SSP such as Proto-Indo-European /st/ and /spl/ (which many of its descendants have, including English).

Certain consonants are more or less likely to appear in consonant clusters, especially in certain positions. The Tsou language of Taiwan has initial clusters such as /tf/, which does not violate the sonority sequencing principle but is unusual in having the labio-dental /f/ in the second position. The cluster /mx/ is also rare but occurs in Russian words such as мха (/mxa/).

Consonant clusters at the ends of syllables are less common but follow the same principles. Clusters are more likely to begin with a liquid, approximant, or nasal and end with a fricative, affricate, or stop, such as in English "world" /wə(ɹ)ld/. Yet again, there are exceptions, such as English "lapse" /læps/.

== See also ==
- English consonant cluster reductions
- Vowel cluster
- Conjunct consonant
- Consonant stacking

== Bibliography ==
- Bayley, R. (1994). "Consonant cluster reduction in Tejano English". Language Variation and Change. 6 (3): 303. doi:10.1017/S0954394500001708. S2CID 145407662.
- Beebe, Leslie M. (1975). "Occupational Prestige and Consonant Cluster Simplification in Bangkok Thai". International Journal of the Sociology of Language (5). doi:10.1515/ijsl.1975.5.43.
- Côté, M. (2004). "Consonant cluster simplification in Québec French". Probus. 16 (2): 151. doi:10.1515/prbs.2004.16.2.151. S2CID 170972749.
- Dziubalska-Kołaczyk, K. (2019). "On the structure, survival and change of consonant clusters". Folia Linguistica. 53(s40-s1) (53): 107. doi:10.1515/flih-2019-0006. S2CID 199546117.
- Easterday, S. (2019). Highly Complex Syllable Structure: A Typological and Diachronic study. Berlin: Language Science Press. ISBN 9783961101955.
- Guy, G. R.; Boyd, S. (1990). "The development of a morphological class". Language Variation and Change. 2 (1): 1. doi:10.1017/S0954394500000235. S2CID 145289008.
- Harper, Douglas (n.d.). "angst". Online Etymology Dictionary.
- Jun, J. (2011). "Positional effects in consonant clusters". The Blackwell Companion to Phonology. 2: 1103.
- National Reading Panel (n.d.). "National reading panel, page 2-99" (PDF).
- Polgárdi, Krisztina (2015). "Syncope, syllabic consonant formation, and the distribution of stressed vowels in English". Journal of Linguistics. 51 (2): 383–423. doi:10.1017/S0022226714000486.
- Reading Rockets (5 August 2013). "Phonics and Word Recognition Instruction in Early Reading Programs, Reading Rockets".
- Wells, J. C. (n.d.). "Syllabification and allophony".
- Wilson, C. (2001). "Consonant cluster neutralisation and targeted constraints". Phonology. 18 (1): 147. doi:10.1017/S0952675701004043. S2CID 62574684.
