= Ersu =

Ersu may refer to:

== People ==
- Ersu Şaşma (born 1999), Turkish pole vaulter
- Erten Ersu (born 1994), Turkish football player
- Kerem Ersü (born 1967), Turkish archer

== Other ==
- Ersu language
