= Daqiao, Mianning County =

Daqiao 大桥镇
- Town
- Location in Sichuan
- Coordinates: 28°40′49″N 102°12′08″E
- Country: People's Republic of China
- Province: Sichuan
- Autonomous prefecture: Liangshan
- County: Mianning
- Elevation: 2,037 m (6,683 ft)
- Time zone: UTC+8 (China Standard)

Daqiao (simplified Chinese: 大桥; traditional Chinese: 大橋; pinyin: Dàqiáo; lit. 'great or large bridge') is a town of Mianning County in the northwest of the Liangshan Yi Autonomous Prefecture, southern Sichuan province, China, located at the southern end of a peninsula abutting into the Beiji River (北基河) Dam 15 km (9.3 mi) north of the county seat. As of 2018, it has eight villages under its administration.

== See also ==
- List of township-level divisions of Sichuan
