= Ersuic languages =

Qiangic language cluster of China

Ersuic
- Geographic distribution: China
- Native speakers: (20,000 cited 1982)
- Linguistic classification: Sino-Tibetan: Tibeto-Burman; Qiangic; Ersuic
- Subdivisions: Ersu; Lizu; Tosu

Language codes
- ISO 639-3: ers
- Glottolog: ersu1242
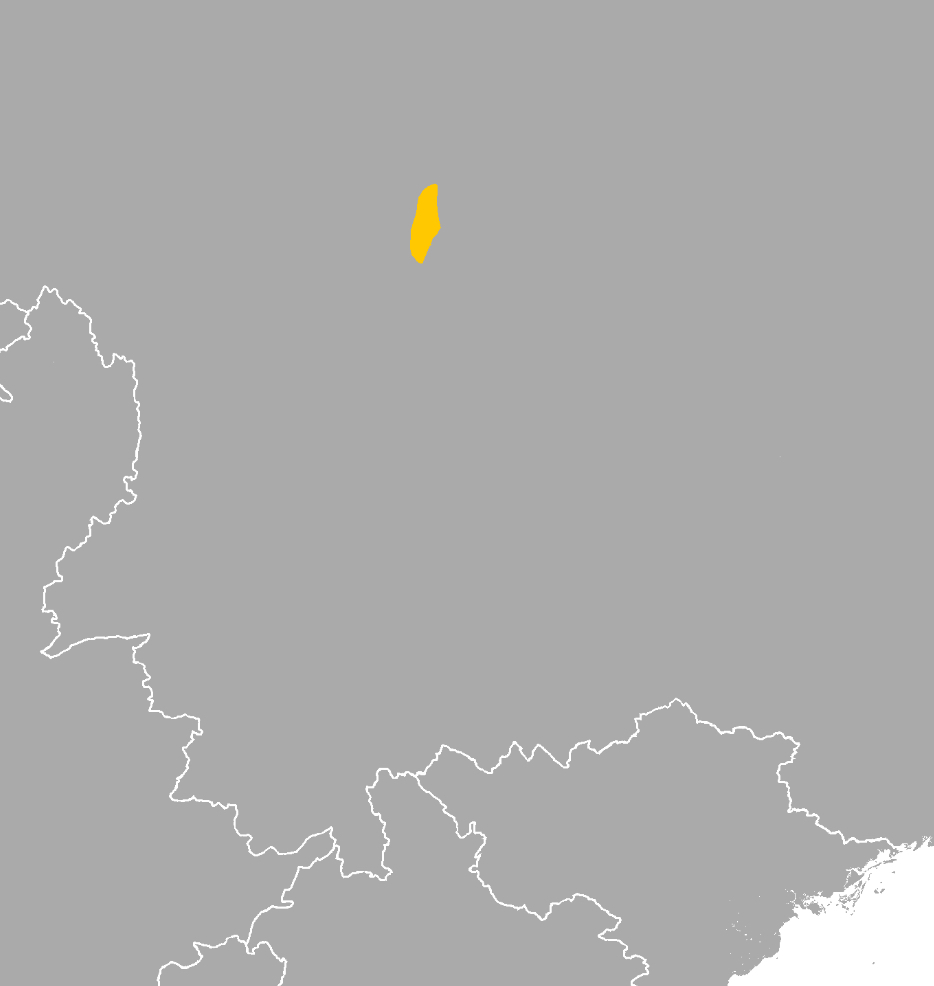

The Ersuic languages (Chinese: 尔苏, Ersu; also called Duoxu or Erhsu) are a Qiangic language cluster of the Sino-Tibetan language family. Ersu languages are spoken by about 20,000 people in China as reported by Sun (1982). Muya (alternatively Menia or Menya) is reported to be related, but it is not known how it fits in.

Ersuic speakers live in the western part of China's Sichuan province (several counties within the Garzê Tibetan Autonomous Prefecture, Liangshan Yi Autonomous Prefecture, and the prefecture-level city of Ya'an). Most of them are classified by the Chinese government as members of the Tibetan ethnic group, although some also are registered as Han Chinese. Older adults mostly use Ersu, but younger people also use Chinese or Yi.

The Ersu Shaba script of the shābā religious books is a pictographic system of proto-writing. The system, in which the color of the characters has an effect on the meaning, was inspired by Chinese writing and was created in the 11th century.

== Languages ==
There are three Ersuic languages.

- Ersu 尔苏 (Eastern Ersu) – 13,000 speakers
- Lizu 傈苏, 里汝, 吕苏 (Western Ersu) – 4,000 speakers; 7,000 speakers
- Tosu 多续 (Central Ersu) – almost no speakers remaining

Yu (2012) classifies Ersu languages as follows, with defining innovations given in parentheses.

Proto-Ersuic

- Tosu
- Ersu (ja- adjective prefix)
  - Hanyuan 汉源
  - Zeluo 则落 / Qingshui 清水 (*ui- > ri-, *tɕ- > ts-, etc.)
- Lizu (*j- > ɲ-, *Ke > Kɯ, *riu > ri)
  - Mianning 冕宁 (alveopalatal split)
  - Central (*st- > k-, *HC- > C-)
    - Naiqu 乃渠
    - Kala 卡拉 (from Chirkova (2008))
    - Kala 卡拉 (from Huang & Renzeng (1991))

== Grammar ==
Ersu is a subject–object–verb language. It has three tones.

== Works cited ==
- Chirkova, Katia (2008). Essential Characteristics of Lizu, a Qiangic Language of Western Sichuan. Workshop on Tibeto-Burman Languages of Sichuan, November 21–24, 2008.
- Huang, Bufan 黄布凡; Renzeng, Wangmu 仁增旺姆 (1991). "Lǚsūyǔ" 吕苏语 [The Lǚsū Language]. In Dai, Qingxia 戴庆厦; et al. (eds.). Zàng-Miǎnyǔ shíwǔ zhǒng 藏缅语十五种 [Fifteen Tibeto-Burman Languages] (in Chinese). Beijing: Yanshan chubanshe. pp. 132–152.
- Sun, Hongkai 孙宏开 (1982). "Ěrsū (Duōxù) Huà jiǎnjiè" 尔苏（多续）话简介 [A Brief Introduction to Ersu (Doshu)]. Yǔyán yánjiù 语言研究 (in Chinese). 3: 241–264.
- Yu, Dominic (2012). Proto-Ersuic (PDF) (Ph.D. thesis). University of California, Berkeley.
