= Dorig (Vanuatu) =

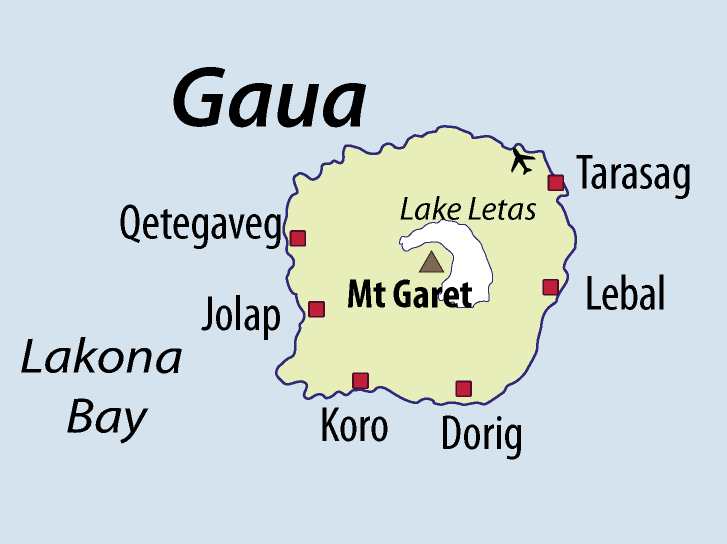
The village of Dorig, south of Gaua island.

Dorig (Wetamut pronunciation: [ⁿdʊˈriɣ]) is a village located on the south coast of Gaua, in the Banks Islands of Vanuatu.

Its population is approximately 250. Their language is also called Dorig.

== Name ==
The name Dorig, spelled Dōrig, is derived from the name of the village where it is spoken. The term is related to Dōlav (the Dorig name of a village that is called in Lakon as Jōlap [t͡ʃʊˈlap]), with the -rig and -lav parts meaning "small" and "big" respectively. The element dō is probably related to Mota nua "cliff"; hence one possible Proto-Torres-Banks form is *ⁿduariɣi "small cliff".
