= Zeyuan, Mianning =

Zeyuan 泽远镇
- Town
- Location in Sichuan
- Coordinates: 28°12′29″N 102°04′09″E
- Country: People's Republic of China
- Province: Sichuan
- Autonomous prefecture: Liangshan
- County: Mianning
- Time zone: UTC+8 (China Standard)
- Area code: +86 (0) 834

Zeyuan (simplified Chinese: 泽远; traditional Chinese: 澤遠; pinyin: Zé yuǎn; lit. 'Z E Garden') is a town of Mianning County, Liangshan Yi Autonomous Prefecture, Sichuan Province, People's Republic of China.

== Administrative divisions ==
The town is divided into the following villages:

Qianjin, Hongzhuan, Jinxing, Anha, Yuejin, Mayelin, Dongfang, Wumo, Naki, and Bayi Villages.
