= Mianning County =

Mianning County 冕宁县 · ꍿꆈꑤ · མེན་ཉིང་རྫོང་།
- County
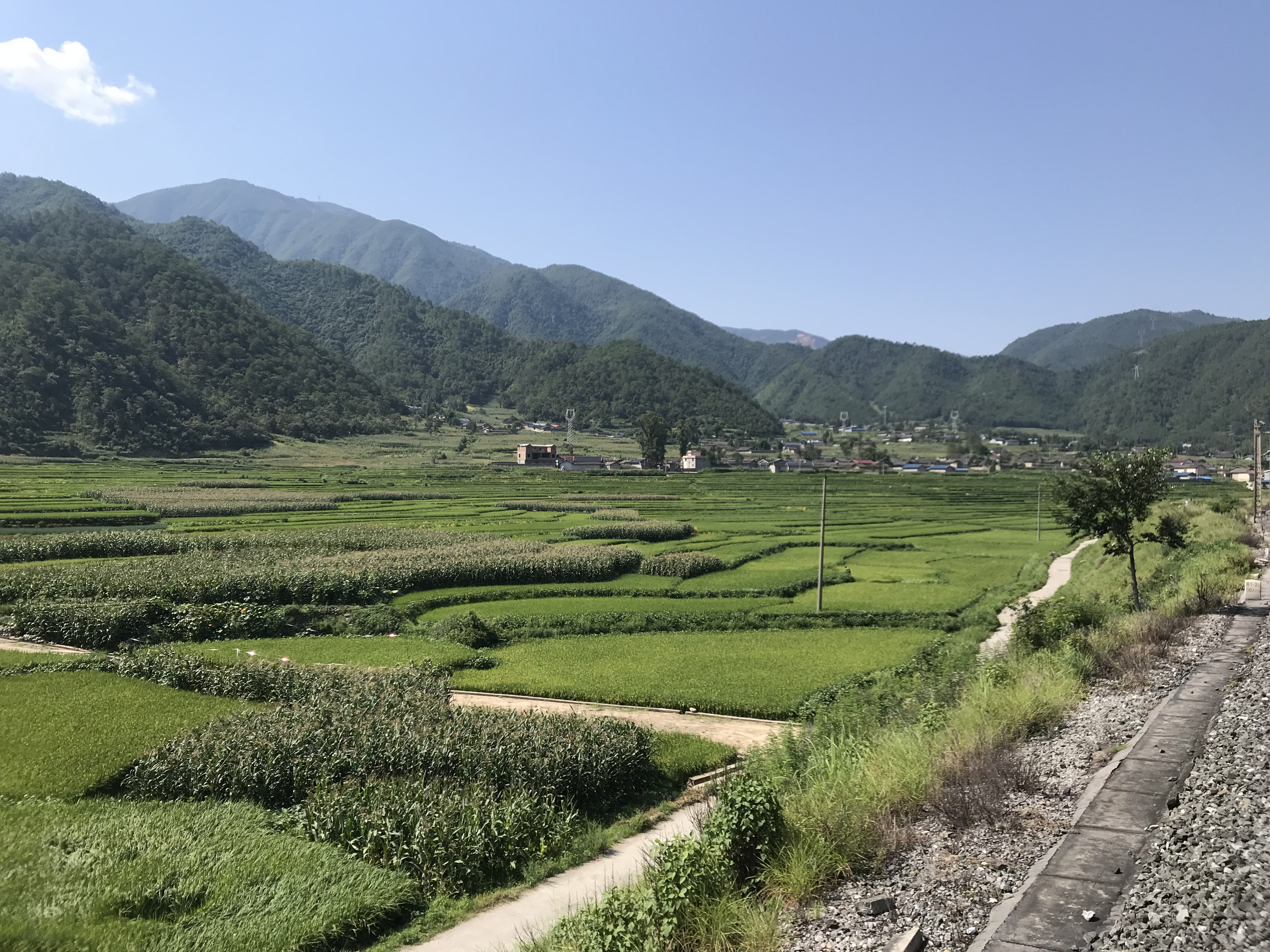
- A rural landscape in the county

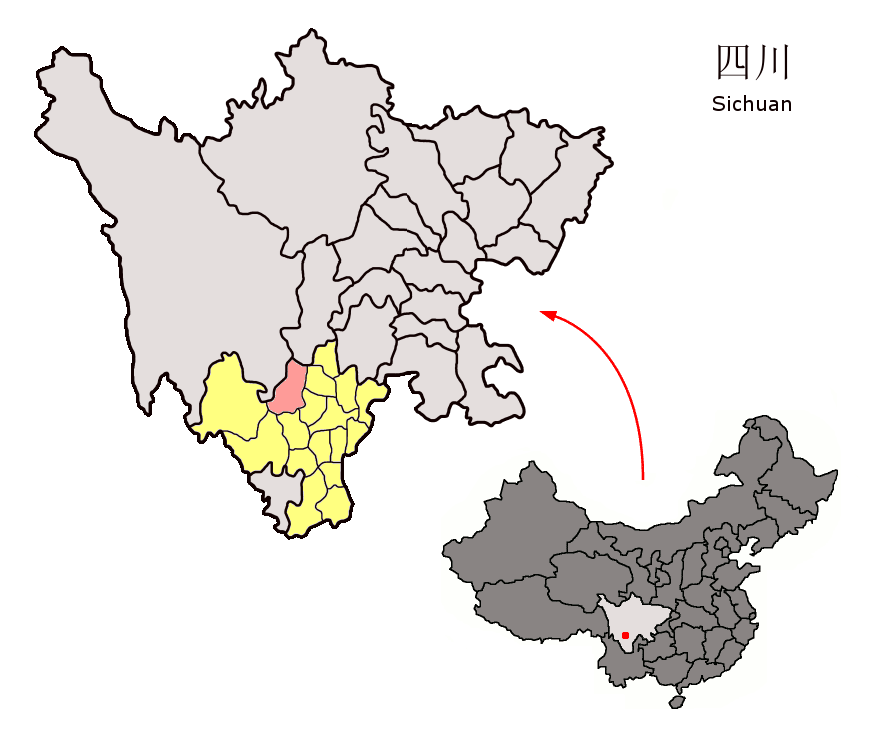
- Location of Mianning County (red) within Liangshan Prefecture (yellow) and Sichuan

- Location of the seat in Sichuan Mianning (China)
- Country: China
- Province: Sichuan
- Autonomous prefecture: Liangshan
- County seat: Gaoyang Subdistrict

Area
  - Total: 4,432 km^{2} (1,711 sq mi)

Population (2020)
  - Total: 369,166
  - Density: 83.30/km^{2} (215.7/sq mi)
- Time zone: UTC+8 (China Standard)
- Website: www.mn.gov.cn

Mianning County

Chinese name
- Simplified Chinese: 冕宁县
- Traditional Chinese: 冕寧縣
Transcriptions
Standard Mandarin
- Hanyu Pinyin: Miǎnníng Xiàn

Tibetan name
- Tibetan: མེན་ཉིང་རྫོང་།
Transcriptions
- Wylie: men nying rdzong
- Tibetan Pinyin: Mênnying Zong

Yi name
- Yi: ꍿꆈꑤ; Romanisation: rruo nuo xiep

Mianning County (Chinese: 冕宁县, Yi: ꍿꆈꑤ, Tibetan: མེན་ཉིང་རྫོང་།) is a county of Sichuan Province, China. It is under the administration of the Liangshan Yi Autonomous Prefecture.

== History ==
Mianning County has a long history of being a multi-ethnic region. The Annals of Mianning County (冕宁县志), published during the reign of the Xianfeng Emperor (1850-1861), listed a number of major ethnic groups in the region, including the Tosu, Lizu, Yi, and the Namuzi peoples.

== Climate ==
Climate data for Mianning, elevation 1,774 m (5,820 ft), (1991–2020 normals, extremes 1981–present)
Month	Jan	Feb	Mar	Apr	May	Jun	Jul	Aug	Sep	Oct	Nov	Dec	Year
Record high °C (°F)	22.1 (71.8)	25.6 (78.1)	31.4 (88.5)	32.4 (90.3)	33.8 (92.8)	33.2 (91.8)	33.3 (91.9)	34.1 (93.4)	32.9 (91.2)	30.8 (87.4)	26.4 (79.5)	21.4 (70.5)	34.1 (93.4)
Mean daily maximum °C (°F)	14.6 (58.3)	17.2 (63.0)	21.1 (70.0)	24.1 (75.4)	25.5 (77.9)	25.2 (77.4)	26.4 (79.5)	26.6 (79.9)	23.2 (73.8)	20.1 (68.2)	17.7 (63.9)	14.4 (57.9)	21.3 (70.4)
Daily mean °C (°F)	6.1 (43.0)	8.3 (46.9)	11.8 (53.2)	15.3 (59.5)	18.2 (64.8)	19.6 (67.3)	20.9 (69.6)	20.7 (69.3)	18.1 (64.6)	15.0 (59.0)	11.1 (52.0)	7.1 (44.8)	14.4 (57.8)
Mean daily minimum °C (°F)	−0.2 (31.6)	1.2 (34.2)	4.4 (39.9)	8.5 (47.3)	12.8 (55.0)	15.9 (60.6)	17.3 (63.1)	16.9 (62.4)	14.9 (58.8)	11.6 (52.9)	6.4 (43.5)	1.9 (35.4)	9.3 (48.7)
Record low °C (°F)	−6.3 (20.7)	−7.6 (18.3)	−3.8 (25.2)	−0.9 (30.4)	4.3 (39.7)	8.5 (47.3)	11.4 (52.5)	10.6 (51.1)	7.2 (45.0)	3.6 (38.5)	−4.0 (24.8)	−6.3 (20.7)	−7.6 (18.3)
Average precipitation mm (inches)	2.7 (0.11)	4.6 (0.18)	16.7 (0.66)	40.5 (1.59)	96.8 (3.81)	206.0 (8.11)	269.0 (10.59)	195.9 (7.71)	176.3 (6.94)	65.8 (2.59)	13.9 (0.55)	2.5 (0.10)	1,090.7 (42.94)
Average precipitation days (≥ 0.1 mm)	2.2	2.7	7.3	11.9	16.3	22.0	21.2	19.1	19.3	14.4	5.4	1.9	143.7
Average snowy days	1.7	1.7	0.6	0	0	0	0	0	0	0	0.1	0.8	4.9
Average relative humidity (%)	61	56	56	59	64	76	80	78	81	74	70	66	68
Mean monthly sunshine hours	201.7	197.1	224.0	216.4	185.7	110.8	127.9	147.1	90.2	102.8	153.3	172.2	1,929.2
Percentage possible sunshine	61	62	60	56	44	27	30	37	25	29	48	54	44
Source: China Meteorological Administration All-time October highall-time November record high

== Administrative divisions ==
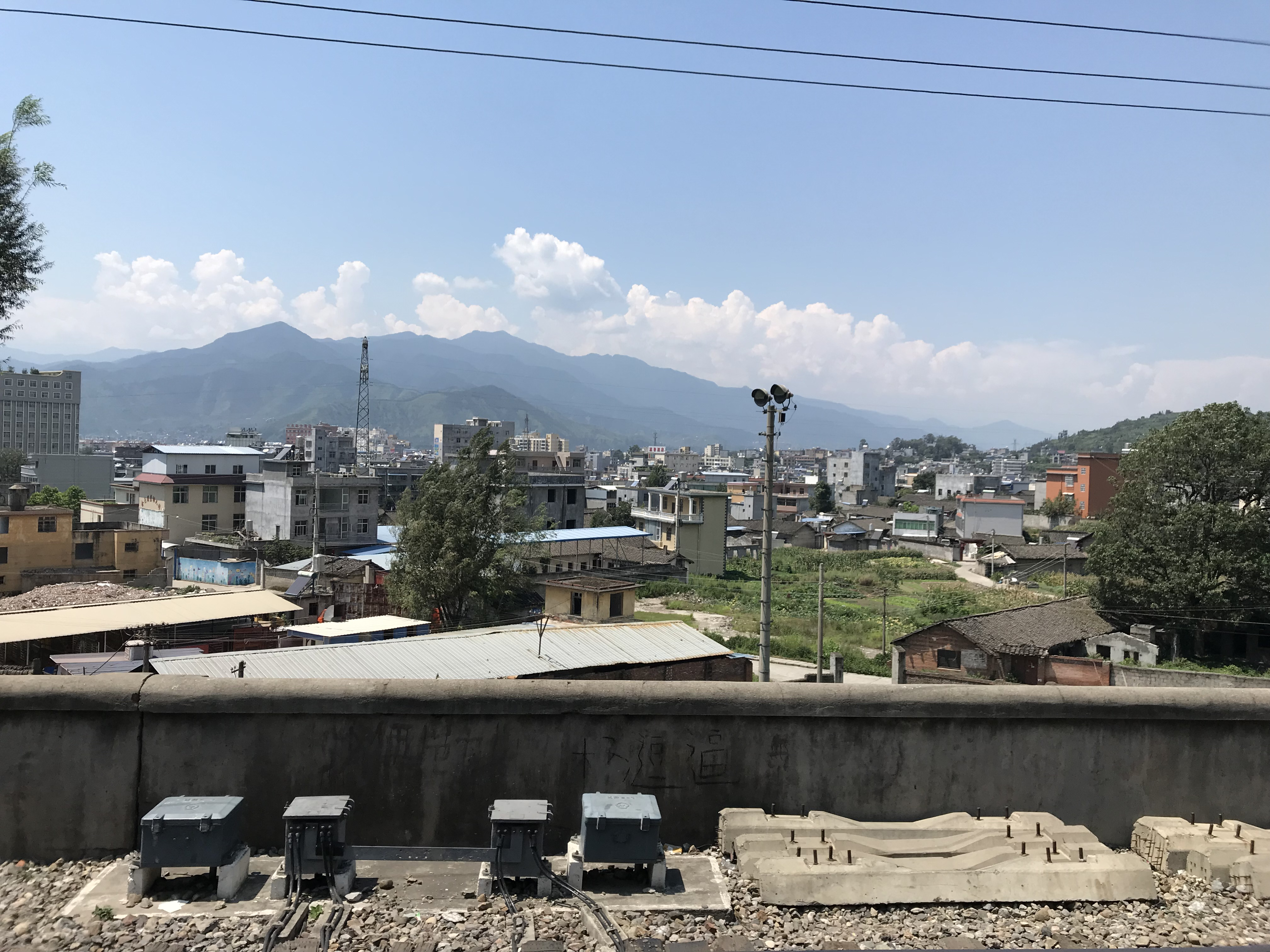
A view of the Lugu Town

Mianning County administers 1 subdistrict, 15 towns, 2 townships, and 1 ethnic township.

Name	Simplified Chinese	Hanyu Pinyin	Yi	Romanized Yi	Administrative division code
Subdistrict
Gaoyang Subdistrict	高阳街道	Gāoyáng Jiēdào	ꇨꑸꏦꈜ	guo yiep jie gga	513433001
Towns
Manshuiwan Town	漫水湾镇	Mànshuǐwān Zhèn	ꂮꎹꃔꍔ	mit shep fap zhep	513433101
Daqiao Town	大桥镇	Dàqiáo Zhèn	ꄊꐇꍔ	dap quop zhep	513433102
Fuxing Town	复兴镇	Fùxīng Zhèn	ꃛꑟꍔ	fup xi zhep	513433103
Lugu Town	泸沽镇	Lúgū Zhèn	ꆹꇬꍔ	li go zhep	513433104
Yihai Town	彝海镇	Yíhǎi Zhèn	ꎿꀸꍔ	shur pit zhep	513433106
Shilong Town	石龙镇	Shílóng Zhèn	ꏃꇊꍔ	shyp lop zhep	513433107
Hebian Town	河边镇	Hébiān Zhèn	ꉼꀘꍔ	hop bi zhep	513433109
Jinping Town	锦屏镇	Jǐnpíng Zhèn	ꏢꀻꍔ	ji pip zhep	513433110
Lizhuang Town	里庄镇	Lǐzhuāng Zhèn	ꅿꍋꍔ	ni zhuo zhep	513433112
Hui'an Town	惠安镇	Huì'ān Zhèn	ꉼꉢꍔ	hop nga zhep	513433113
Hongmo Town	宏模镇	Hóngmó Zhèn	ꉼꃆꍔ	hop mup zhep	513433114
Zeyuan Town	泽远镇	Zéyuǎn Zhèn	ꊱꑻꍔ	cip yuo zhep	513433115
Ruoshui Town	若水镇	Ruòshuǐ Zhèn	ꏌꎳꍔ	ruop shox zhep	513433116
Miansha Town	棉沙镇	Miánshā Zhèn	ꂴꎭꍔ	miep sha zhep	513433117
Mofanggou Town	磨房沟镇	Mófánggōu Zhèn	ꃀꃔꇬꍔ	mop fap go zhep	513433118
Townships
Xinxing Township	新兴乡	Xīnxīng Xiāng	ꑝꑟꑣ	xit xi xie	513433230
Jianmei Township	健美乡	Jiànměi Xiāng	ꏧꂮꑣ	xjiep mit xie	513433231
Ethnic township
Ho'ê Tibetan Ethnic Township (He'ai)	和爱藏族乡	Hé'ài Zàngzú Xiāng	ꉼꉟꀒꋤꑣ	hop ngiep op zzup xie	513433226

== Ethnic groups ==
A large number of the Tosu ethnic group, which comprises about 2,000 people, live throughout Mianning County. Sizable clusters of Tosu people are located within Gaoyang Subdistrict, the former town of Houshan (后山镇, now part of Shilong), Fuxing, Hui'an, the former township of Haha (哈哈乡, now part of Gaoyang Subdistrict and Ruoshui), the former township of Linli (林里乡, now part of Fuxing), and the former town of Shaba (沙坝镇, now part of Manshuiwan).

== Languages ==
Two of the three Ersuic languages, the critically endangered Tosu language, and the Lizu language, are spoken within Mianning County. A 2013 survey found nine partial speakers of the Tosu language, all of whom lived in Mianning County, and were proficient in Southwestern Mandarin, which they used for daily life.
