= Liquid consonant =

Class of speech sounds

In linguistics, a liquid consonant or simply liquid is a consonant class that consists of rhotics and laterals, which are also respectively described as "R-like" and "L-like" sounds. Liquids have also been defined as "non-nasal sonorant consonants" (although this definition often includes semivowels as well). The word liquid seems to be a calque of the Ancient Greek word ὑγρός (hygrós 'moist'), initially used by grammarian Dionysius Thrax to describe Greek sonorants.

Liquid consonants are notable for several distinctive properties. They are more prone to be part of consonant clusters and of the syllable nucleus. Acoustically, their third formants are generally non-predictable based on the first two formants. Another important feature is their complex articulation, which makes them a difficult consonant class to study with precision and the last consonants to be produced by children during their phonological development. They are also more likely to undergo certain types of phonological changes such as assimilation, dissimilation and metathesis.

Most languages have at least one liquid in their phonemic inventory. English has two, /l/ and /r/.

== History and etymology ==
The grammarian Dionysius Thrax used the Ancient Greek word ὑγρός (hygrós, 'moist') to describe the sonorant consonants ([l, r, m, n]) of classical Greek. It is assumed that the term referred to their changing or inconsistent (or "fluid") effect on meter in classical Greek verse when they occur as the second member of a consonant cluster. This word was calqued into Latin as liquidus (possibly because of a mistranslation) and this calque has been retained in the Western European phonetic tradition.

== Sonority and syllable structure ==
In the sonority hierarchy, liquids are considered the most sonorous sounds after vowels and glides, with laterals considered to be less sonorous than rhotics. This explains why they are more likely to be part of consonant clusters than other consonants (excluding glides), and to follow obstruents in initial consonant clusters and precede them in final consonant clusters.

Liquids also hold this position in the hierarchy of syllable peaks, which means that liquids are theoretically more likely to be syllabic (or, in other words, be part of a syllable nucleus) than any other consonants, although some studies show that syllabic nasals are overall more favoured. Thus Czech, Slovak and other Slavic languages allow their liquid consonants /l/ and /r/ to be the center of their syllables – as witnessed by the classic tonguetwister in Czech strč prst skrz krk "push (your) finger through (your) throat." Additionally, Slovak also has long versions of these syllabic consonants, written ŕ and ĺ, e.g.: kĺb [kɫ̩ːp] 'joint', vŕba [ˈvr̩ːba] 'willow', škvŕn [ʃkvr̩ːn] '(of) spots'. This is also true for General American English (see the words barrel and anchor) and other English accents.

Sequences of an obstruent and a liquid consonant are often ambiguous as far as syllabification is concerned. In these cases, whether the two consonants are part of the same syllable or not heavily depends on the individual language, and closely related languages can behave differently (such as Icelandic and Faroese). In Latin and Ancient Greek, obstruent + liquid consonant clusters (known as muta cum liquida) supposedly were ambiguous in this sense, and as such were often used to manipulate meter.

== Acoustic and articulatory phonetics ==
Acoustically, liquids seem to have a third formant of unexpected value when compared to the first and second formants. This contrasts with non-liquid approximants, whose third formant value is expected based on the first two formants.

In articulatory phonetics, liquids are described as controlled gestures, which are slower and require more precise tongue movement during the "homing phase," when the tongue adjusts towards the place of articulation of the consonant. Due to the fact that babies prefer ballistic gestures, which rely on the propelling motion of the jaw, liquids usually occur later in a child's phonological development, and they are more likely to be deleted in consonant clusters before the age of three. Liquids have also been described as consonants involving "complex lingual geometries."

Due to liquids being difficult to analyse on a purely auditory basis, the use of ultrasound paired with audio recordings is increasing in order to better determine the full range of articulatory and acoustic characteristics of liquids.

== Sound changes ==
Liquids seem to be more or less subjected to certain sound changes than other consonants. On an auditory level, liquid consonants resemble each other, which is likely the reason they undergo or trigger assimilation, dissimilation and metathesis.

=== Metathesis ===
Cross-linguistically, liquids tend to be more prone to metathesis than other consonants, especially long-distance metathesis.

In Spanish, a frequent example is the behaviour of /r/ and /l/:

- Lat. crocodīlus > Span. cocodrilo 'crocodile'
- Lat. mīrāculum > Span. milagro 'miracle'
- Lat. perīculum > Span. peligro 'danger'
- Lat. parabola > Span. palabra 'speech'

In English, comfortable is frequently pronounced /ˈkʌmf.tɚ.bəl/ in rhotic varieties, even though its stem, comfort, is pronounced /ˈkʌm.fɚt/, with the rhotic /ɹ/ in its original position.

=== Assimilation ===
Liquid consonants can also undergo assimilation: compare Italian parlare "to speak" with Sicilian parrari. This phenomenon, which is not so common worldwide with respect to liquids, is attested in Finnish. For example, the root tul- "to come" combined with the past participle suffix -nut, yields the surface form tullut. This is one of the reasons long liquids are common in Finnish.

A specific form of liquid assimilation, liquid harmony, is present is some languages. In Sundanese, some morphemes have two different realisations depending on what liquid is present in the root.

=== Dissimilation ===
Liquids are also prone to dissimilation when they occur in sequence. For example, Old Italian colonnello 'colonel' is borrowed into Middle French as coronnel, which is in turn loaned into English as colonel, with an orthography inspired by Italian but with the /ˈkɚnəl/ or /ˈkɜːnel/ pronunciation with the rhotic r, which is absent in writing.

=== Epenthesis ===
Epenthesis, or the addition of sounds, is common in environments where liquids are present, especially consonant clusters. The epenthetic sound can be a vowel or a consonant. For example, the genitive of the Ancient Greek noun ἀνήρ anḗr "man" is ἀνδρός andrós, with the insertion of a [d] sound between a nasal consonant and the liquid [r]. Another example is the Irish word seilg 'hunt, chase', usually pronounced with an epenthetic schwa [ə] after the liquid [lʲ]: [ˈʃɛlʲəg].

=== Other types of phonological change ===
Liquids can often be the result of lenition, the "weakening" of consonants (for example, Sanskrit पीडा (pīḍā, 'pain') later became Pali pīḷā). They are also likely to become vowels or glides, a process known as vocalisation. See, for example, the pronunciation of Spanish /ɾ/ as [j] in the Cibao region of the Dominican Republic at the end of a syllable: standard Spanish mujer /muˈxeɾ/ is optionally pronounced [muˈxej] in Cibaeño Spanish.

== Occurrence and geographical distribution ==
According to a survey by linguist Ian Maddieson, most languages have one to three liquids (with systems of two liquids being the most common) and they are usually dental or alveolar. Liquid consonants are also rarely geminated crosslinguistically. Across the world's languages, having multiple liquidsis more common than having multiple rhotics; but if a language has only one liquid, that single liquid is more likely to be a rhotic. Some languages, such as Japanese, Korean or Apinayé, have a single liquid phoneme that has both lateral and rhotic allophones.

All languages of Europe have at least one rhotic and one lateral, and therefore, at least two liquids. The number of liquids in European languages grows in the margins of the continent. The most infrequent types of liquids in Europe are to be found in Western Europe, Scandinavia and the Caucasus.

English has two liquid phonemes: one lateral, /l/, and one rhotic, /ɹ/. Some European languages, such as Greek, Italian and Serbo-Croatian, have more than two liquid phonemes. All three languages have the set /l/, /ʎ/, /r/, with two laterals and one rhotic. Similarly, the Iberian languages contrast four liquid phonemes: /l/, /ʎ/, /ɾ/ and a fourth phoneme that is an alveolar trill in most Iberian languages except for many varieties of Portuguese, where it is a uvular trill or fricative (also, the majority of Spanish speakers lack /ʎ/ and use the central /ʝ/ instead). Some European languages, for example Russian and Irish, contrast a palatalized lateral–rhotic pair with an unpalatalized (or velarized) set (e.g. /lʲ/ /rʲ/ /l/ /r/ in Russian).

Elsewhere in the world, a set of two liquids of the types mentioned above remains the most common attribute of a language's consonant inventory except in North America and Australia. A majority of indigenous North American languages do not have rhotics at all and there is a wide variety of lateral sounds, though most are obstruent laterals rather than liquids. Most indigenous Australian languages, in contrast, are very rich in liquids, with some having as many as seven distinct liquids. They typically include dental, alveolar, retroflex and palatal laterals, and as many as three rhotics.

On the other side, there are many indigenous languages in the Amazon Basin and eastern North America, as well as a few in Asia and Africa, with no liquids.

Polynesian languages typically have only one liquid, which may be either a lateral or a rhotic. Non-Polynesian Oceanic languages usually have both /l/ and /r/, occasionally more (e.g., Araki has /l/, /ɾ/, /r/) or less (e.g., Mwotlap has only /l/). Hiw is unusual in having a prestopped velar lateral /ᶢʟ/ as its only liquid.

== See also ==
- Sonorant
- List of phonetics topics
- Perception of English /r/ and /l/ by Japanese speakers
- Engrish
