= Syllable =

Unit of speech sounds

A syllable is a basic unit of organization within a sequence of speech sounds, such as within a word. In phonology and studies of languages, syllables are often considered the "building blocks" of words. A syllable usually consists of a nucleus (most often a vowel), which may be preceded by an onset and followed by a coda (collectively margins, which are most often consonants). Syllables may bear properties such as stress and tone and be subject to operations such as reduplication. Speech can usually be divided up into a whole number of syllables: for example, the word ignite is made of two syllables: ig and nite. Most languages of the world use relatively simple syllable structures that often alternate between vowels and consonants.

Despite being present in virtually all human languages, syllables still have no precise definition that is valid for all known languages. A common criterion for finding syllable boundaries is native-speaker intuition, but individuals sometimes disagree on them.

The earliest attested instances of syllabic writing are on tablets written around 2800 BC in the Sumerian city of Ur, which predate the earliest instances of alphabetic writing by several centuries. The shift from pictographic writing to syllabic writing has been called "the most important advance in the history of writing".

A word that consists of a single syllable (like English dog) is called a monosyllable (and is said to be monosyllabic). Similar terms include disyllable (and disyllabic; also bisyllable and bisyllabic) for a word of two syllables; trisyllable (and trisyllabic) for a word of three syllables; and polysyllable (and polysyllabic), which may refer to any word of more than one syllable.

== Etymology ==
Syllable is an Anglo-Norman variation of Old French sillabe, from Latin syllaba, from Koine Greek συλλαβή syllabḗ (Ancient Greek pronunciation: [sylːabɛ̌ː]). συλλαβή means "the taken together", referring to letters that are taken together to make a single sound.

συλλαβή is a verbal noun from the verb συλλαμβάνω syllambánō, a compound of the preposition σύν sýn "with" and the verb λαμβάνω lambánō "take". The noun uses the root λαβ-, which appears in the aorist tense; the present tense stem λαμβάν- is formed by adding a nasal infix ⟨μ⟩ ⟨m⟩ before the β b and a suffix -αν -an at the end.

== Transcription ==
In the International Phonetic Alphabet (IPA), the full stop ⟨.⟩ marks syllable breaks, as in the word "astronomical" ⟨/ˌæs.trə.ˈnɒm.ɪk.əl/⟩.

In practice, however, IPA transcription is typically divided into words by spaces, and often these spaces are also understood to be syllable breaks. In addition, the stress mark ⟨ˈ⟩ is placed immediately before a stressed syllable, and when the stressed syllable is in the middle of a word, in practice, the stress mark also marks a syllable break, for example in the word "understood" ⟨/ʌndərˈstʊd/⟩ (though the syllable boundary may still be explicitly marked with a full stop, e.g. ⟨/ʌn.dər.ˈstʊd/⟩).

When a word space comes in the middle of a syllable (that is, when a syllable spans words), a tie bar ⟨‿⟩ can be used for liaison, as in the French combination les amis ⟨/lɛ.z‿a.mi/⟩. The liaison tie is also used to join lexical words into phonological words, for example hot dog ⟨/ˈhɒt‿dɒɡ/⟩.

A Greek sigma, ⟨σ⟩, is used as a wild card for 'syllable', and a dollar/peso sign, ⟨$⟩, marks a syllable boundary where the usual fullstop might be misunderstood. For example, ⟨σσ⟩ is a pair of syllables, and ⟨V$⟩ is a syllable-final vowel.

== Components ==
Syllable components as a directed graph. Syllable structure as tree diagram according to several phonologic traditions and theories. syllable (σ), rime (ρ), onset (ω), nucleus (ν), coda (κ), tone (τ), initial (ι), medial (μ), final (φ).

Segmentation for cat and sing

=== Onset–nucleus–rime segmentation ===
In this framework, the general structure of a syllable (σ) consists of three segments grouped into two components:

- Onset (ω): A consonant or consonant cluster, obligatory in some languages, optional or even restricted in others
- Rime (ρ): Right branch, contrasts with onset, splits into nucleus and coda
  - Nucleus (ν): A vowel or syllabic consonant, obligatory in most languages
  - Coda (κ): A consonant or consonant cluster, optional in some languages, highly restricted or prohibited in others

The syllable is usually considered right-branching, i.e. nucleus and coda are grouped together as a "rime" and are only distinguished at the second level.

The sounds occupying these positions may also be denoted with the following notation:

- Consonant (C, or, for a consonant from a idiosyncratic set of possibilities, X)
- Obstruent (T)
- Nasal consonant (N)
- Liquid consonant (L)
- Glide (G, or, less often, H)
- Vowel (V)
- Tone (T, or, if there is a risk of confusion with an obstruent, ᵀ)
- an exact phoneme or even phone (any specific IPA symbol)

possibly with the following notation to indicate occurrence count:

- "Exactly one" (no exponent)
- "Zero or one" (surrounding parentheses or, more rarely, ^{?} after the letter)
- "Zero or more" (^{*} after the letter)
- "One or more" (^{+} after the letter)

The nucleus is usually the vowel in the middle of a syllable. The onset is the sound or sounds occurring before the nucleus, and the coda (literally 'tail') is the sound or sounds that follow the nucleus. They are sometimes collectively known as the shell. The term rime covers the nucleus plus coda. In the one-syllable English word cat, the nucleus is a (the sound that can be shouted or sung on its own), the onset c, the coda t, and the rime at. This syllable can be abstracted as a consonant-vowel-consonant syllable, abbreviated CVC. Languages vary greatly in the restrictions on the sounds making up the onset, nucleus and coda of a syllable, according to what is termed a language's phonotactics.

Although every syllable has supra-segmental features, these are usually ignored if not semantically relevant, e.g. in tonal languages.

=== Chinese segmentation ===
Traditional Chinese syllable structure

In the syllable structure of Sinitic languages, the onset is replaced with an initial, and a semivowel or liquid forms another segment, called the medial. These four segments are grouped into two slightly different components:

- Initial ⟨ι⟩: Optional onset, excluding semivowels
- Final ⟨φ⟩: Medial, nucleus, and final consonant grouped together
  - Medial ⟨μ⟩: Optional semivowel or liquid
  - Nucleus ⟨ν⟩: A vowel or syllabic consonant
  - Coda ⟨κ⟩: Optional final consonant
- Tone ⟨τ⟩: May be carried by the syllable as a whole or by the rime

In many languages of the Mainland Southeast Asia linguistic area, such as Chinese, the syllable structure is expanded to include an additional, optional medial segment located between the onset (often termed the initial in this context) and the rime. The medial is normally a semivowel, but reconstructions of Old Chinese generally include liquid medials (/r/ in modern reconstructions, /l/ in older versions), and many reconstructions of Middle Chinese include a medial contrast between /i/ and /j/, where the /i/ functions phonologically as a glide rather than as part of the nucleus. In addition, many reconstructions of both Old and Middle Chinese include complex medials such as /rj/, /ji/, /jw/ and /jwi/. The medial groups phonologically with the rime rather than the onset, and the combination of medial and rime is collectively known as the final.

Some linguists, especially when discussing the modern Chinese varieties, use the terms "final" and "rime" interchangeably. In historical Chinese phonology, however, the distinction between "final" (including the medial) and "rime" (not including the medial) is important in understanding the rime dictionaries and rime tables that form the primary sources for Middle Chinese, and as a result most authors distinguish the two according to the above definition.

=== Grouping of components ===

Hierarchical model for cat and sing

In some theories of phonology, syllable structures are displayed as tree diagrams (similar to the trees found in some types of syntax). Not all phonologists agree that syllables have internal structure; in fact, some phonologists doubt the existence of the syllable as a theoretical entity.

There are many arguments for a hierarchical relationship, rather than a linear one, between the syllable constituents. One hierarchical model groups the syllable nucleus and coda into an intermediate level, the rime. The hierarchical model accounts for the role that the nucleus+coda constituent plays in verse (i.e., rhyming words such as cat and bat are formed by matching both the nucleus and coda, or the entire rime), and for the distinction between heavy and light syllables, which plays a role in phonological processes such as, for example, sound change in Old English scipu and wordu, where in a process called high vowel deletion (HVD), the nominative/accusative plural of single light-syllable roots (like "*scip-") got a "u" ending in OE, whereas heavy syllable roots (like "*word-") would not, giving "scip-u" but "word-∅".

==== Body ====
Left-branching hierarchical model

In some traditional descriptions of certain languages such as Cree and Ojibwe, the syllable is considered left-branching, i.e. onset and nucleus group below a higher-level unit, called a "body" or "core". This contrasts with the coda.

==== Rime ====
The rime or rhyme of a syllable consists of a nucleus and an optional coda. It is the part of the syllable used in most poetic rhymes, and the part that is lengthened or stressed when a person elongates or stresses a word in speech.

The rime is usually the portion of a syllable from the first vowel to the end. For example, /æt/ is the rime of all of the words at, sat, and flat. However, the nucleus does not necessarily need to be a vowel in some languages, such as English. For instance, the rime of the second syllables of the words bottle and fiddle is just /l/, a liquid consonant.

Just as the rime branches into the nucleus and coda, the nucleus and coda may each branch into multiple phonemes. The limit for the number of phonemes which may be contained in each varies by language. For example, Japanese and most Sino-Tibetan languages do not have consonant clusters at the beginning or end of syllables, whereas many Eastern European languages can have more than two consonants at the beginning or end of the syllable. In English, the onset may have up to three consonants, and the coda four.

Rime and rhyme are variants of the same word, but the rarer form rime is sometimes used to mean specifically syllable rime to differentiate it from the concept of poetic rhyme. This distinction is not made by some linguists and does not appear in most dictionaries.

Examples C = consonant, V = vowel, optional components are in parentheses.
structure:	syllable =	onset	+ rhyme
C^{+}V^{+}C*:	C_{1}(C_{2})V_{1}(V_{2})(C_{3})(C_{4}) =	C_{1}(C_{2})	+ V_{1}(V_{2})(C_{3})(C_{4})
V^{+}C*:	V_{1}(V_{2})(C_{3})(C_{4}) =	∅	+ V_{1}(V_{2})(C_{3})(C_{4})

==== Weight ====
Branching nucleus for pout and branching coda for pond

A heavy syllable is generally one with a branching rime, i.e. it is either a closed syllable that ends in a consonant, or a syllable with a branching nucleus, i.e. a long vowel or diphthong. The name is a metaphor, based on the nucleus or coda having lines that branch in a tree diagram.

In some languages, heavy syllables include both VV (branching nucleus) and VC (branching rime) syllables, contrasted with V, which is a light syllable. In other languages, only VV syllables are considered heavy, while both VC and V syllables are light. Some languages distinguish a third type of superheavy syllable, which consists of VVC syllables (with both a branching nucleus and rime) or VCC syllables (with a coda consisting of two or more consonants) or both.

In moraic theory, heavy syllables are said to have two moras, while light syllables are said to have one and superheavy syllables are said to have three. Japanese phonology is generally described this way.

Many languages forbid superheavy syllables, while a significant number forbid any heavy syllable. Some languages strive for constant syllable weight; for example, in stressed, non-final syllables in Italian, short vowels co-occur with closed syllables while long vowels co-occur with open syllables, so that all such syllables are heavy (not light or superheavy).

The difference between heavy and light frequently determines which syllables receive stress – this is the case in Latin and Arabic, for example. The system of poetic meter in many classical languages, such as Classical Greek, Classical Latin, Old Tamil and Sanskrit, is based on syllable weight rather than stress (so-called quantitative rhythm or quantitative meter).

== Syllabification ==
Syllabification is the separation of a word into syllables, whether spoken or written. In most languages, the actually spoken syllables are the basis of syllabification in writing too. Due to the very weak correspondence between sounds and letters in the spelling of modern English, for example, written syllabification in English has to be based mostly on etymological i.e. morphological instead of phonetic principles. English written syllables therefore do not correspond to the actually spoken syllables of the living language.

Phonotactic rules determine which sounds are allowed or disallowed in each part of the syllable. English allows very complicated syllables; syllables may begin with up to three consonants (as in strength), and occasionally end with as many as four (as in angsts, pronounced [æŋsts]). Many other languages are much more restricted; Japanese, for example, only allows /ɴ/ and a chroneme in a coda, and theoretically has no consonant clusters at all, as the onset is composed of at most one consonant.

The linking of a word-final consonant to a vowel beginning the word immediately following it forms a regular part of the phonetics of some languages, including Spanish, Hungarian, and Turkish. Thus, in Spanish, the phrase los hombres ('the men') is pronounced [loˈsom.bɾes], Hungarian az ember ('the human') as [ɒˈzɛm.bɛr], and Turkish nefret ettim ('I hated it') as [nefˈɾe.tet.tim]. In Italian, a final [j] sound can be moved to the next syllable in enchainement, sometimes with a gemination: e.g., non ne ho mai avuti ('I've never had any of them') is broken into syllables as [non.neˈɔ.ma.jaˈvuːti] and io ci vado e lei anche ('I go there and she does as well') is realized as [jo.tʃiˈvaːdo.e.lɛjˈjaŋ.ke]. A related phenomenon, called consonant mutation, is found in the Celtic languages like Irish and Welsh, whereby unwritten (but historical) final consonants affect the initial consonant of the following word.

=== Tautosyllabicity ===
Two or more segments are tautosyllabic (with each other) if they occur in the same syllable. For instance, the English word "cat" (/kæt/) is monosyllabic and so its three phonemes /k/, /æ/ and /t/ are tautosyllabic. They can also be described as sharing a 'tautosyllabic distribution'.

Phonemes that are not tautosyllabic are heterosyllabic. For example, in the English word "mustard" /ˈmʌstərd/, /m/ and /t/ are heterosyllabic since they are members of different syllables.

=== Ambisyllabicity ===
There can be disagreement about the location of some divisions between syllables in spoken language. The problems of dealing with such cases have been most commonly discussed with relation to English. In the case of a word such as hurry, the division may be /hʌr.i/ or /hʌ.ri/, neither of which seems a satisfactory analysis for a non-rhotic accent such as in Received Pronunciation: /hʌr.i/ results in a syllable-final /r/, which is not normally found, while /hʌ.ri/ gives a syllable-final short stressed vowel, which is also non-occurring.

Arguments can be made in favour of one solution or the other: A general rule has been proposed that states that "Subject to certain conditions [...] consonants are syllabified with the more strongly stressed of two flanking syllables", while many other phonologists prefer to divide syllables with the consonant or consonants attached to the following syllable wherever possible. However, an alternative that has received some support is to treat an intervocalic consonant as ambisyllabic, i.e. belonging both to the preceding and to the following syllable: /hʌṛi/. This is discussed in more detail in English phonology § Phonotactics.

Another example could be the nasal velar /ŋ/ written ⟨nh⟩ in Galician, so the word ⟨unha⟩ could be divided /'u.ŋa/ or /'uŋ.a/.

=== Onset ===
The onset (also known as anlaut) is the consonant sound or sounds at the beginning of a syllable, occurring before the nucleus. Most syllables have an onset. Syllables without an onset may be said to have an empty, zero or null onset – that is, nothing where the onset would be.

==== Onset cluster ====
Some languages restrict onsets to be only a single consonant, while others allow multiconsonant onsets according to various rules. For example, in English, onsets such as pr-, pl- and tr- are possible but tl- is not, and sk- is possible but ks- is not. In Greek, however, both ks- and tl- are possible onsets, while contrarily in Classical Arabic no multiconsonant onsets are allowed at all.

Onset clusters often follow the sonority sequencing principle, that is, onsets with increasing sonority (/kl/) are usually preferred to ones with a plateau (/ll/) and even stronger preferred to decreasing sonority (/lk/); however, many languages have counterexamples to this tendency.

==== Null onset ====
Some languages forbid null onsets. In these languages, words beginning in a vowel, like the English word at, are impossible.

This is less strange than it may appear at first, as most such languages allow syllables to begin with a phonemic glottal stop (the sound in the middle of English uh-oh or, in some dialects, the double T in button, represented in the IPA as /ʔ/). In English, a word that begins with a vowel may be pronounced with a non-phonemic (and therefore un-perceived by the speakers) epenthetic glottal stop when following a pause or at the commencement of speech.

Few languages make a phonemic distinction between a word beginning with a vowel and a word beginning with a glottal stop followed by a vowel, since the distinction will generally only be audible following another word. However, Maltese and some Polynesian languages do make such a distinction, as in Hawaiian /ahi/ ('fire') and /ʔahi/ ← /kahi/ ('tuna') and Maltese /∅/ ← Arabic /h/ and Maltese /k~ʔ/ ← Arabic /q/.

Ashkenazi and Sephardi Hebrew may commonly ignore א, ה and ע, and Arabic forbids empty onsets. The names Israel, Abel, Abraham, Omar, Abdullah, and Iraq appear not to have onsets in the first syllable, but in the original Hebrew and Arabic forms they actually begin with various consonants: the semivowel /j/ in יִשְׂרָאֵל yisra'él, the glottal fricative in /h/ הֶבֶל heḇel, the glottal stop /ʔ/ in אַבְרָהָם 'aḇrāhām, or the pharyngeal fricative /ʕ/ in عُمَر ʿumar, عَبْدُ ٱللّٰه ʿabdu llāh, and عِرَاق ʿirāq. Conversely, the Arrernte language of central Australia may prohibit onsets altogether; if so, all syllables have the underlying shape VC(C).

The difference between a syllable with a null onset and one beginning with a glottal stop is often purely a difference of phonological analysis, rather than the actual pronunciation of the syllable. In some cases, the pronunciation of a (putatively) vowel-initial word when following another word – particularly, whether or not a glottal stop is inserted – indicates whether the word should be considered to have a null onset. For example, many Romance languages such as Spanish never insert such a glottal stop, while English does so only some of the time, depending on factors such as conversation speed; in both cases, this suggests that the words in question are truly vowel-initial.

But there are exceptions here, too. For example, standard German (excluding many southern accents) and Arabic both require that a glottal stop be inserted between a word and a following, putatively vowel-initial word. Yet such words are perceived to begin with a vowel in German but a glottal stop in Arabic. The reason for this has to do with other properties of the two languages. For example, a glottal stop does not occur in other situations in German, e.g. before a consonant or at the end of word. On the other hand, in Arabic, not only does a glottal stop occur in such situations (e.g. Classical /saʔala/ "he asked", /raʔj/ "opinion", /dˤawʔ/ "light"), but it occurs in alternations that are clearly indicative of its phonemic status (cf. Classical /kaːtib/ "writer" vs. /maktuːb/ "written", /ʔaːkil/ "eater" vs. /maʔkuːl/ "eaten"). In other words, while the glottal stop is predictable in German (inserted only if a stressed syllable would otherwise begin with a vowel), the same sound is a regular consonantal phoneme in Arabic. The status of this consonant in the respective writing systems corresponds to this difference: there is no reflex of the glottal stop in German orthography, but there is a letter for it in the Arabic alphabet (Hamza (ء)).

The writing system of a language may not correspond with the phonological analysis of the language in terms of its handling of (potentially) null onsets. For example, in some languages written in the Latin alphabet, an initial glottal stop is left unwritten (see the German example); on the other hand, some languages written using non-Latin alphabets such as abjads and abugidas have a special zero consonant to represent a null onset. As an example, in Hangul, the alphabet of the Korean language, a null onset is represented with ㅇ at the left or top section of a grapheme, as in 역 "station", pronounced yeok, where the diphthong yeo is the nucleus and k is the coda.

=== Nucleus ===

Examples of syllable nuclei
Word	Nucleus
cat [kæt]	[æ]
bed [bɛd]	[ɛ]
ode [oʊd]	[oʊ]
beet [bit]	[i]
bite [baɪt]	[aɪ]
rain [ɻeɪn]	[eɪ]
bitten [ˈbɪt.ən] or [ˈbɪt.n̩]	[ɪ] [ə] or [n̩]

The nucleus is usually the vowel in the middle of a syllable. Generally, every syllable requires a nucleus (sometimes called the peak), and the minimal syllable consists only of a nucleus, as in the English words "eye" or "owe". The syllable nucleus is usually a vowel, in the form of a monophthong, diphthong, or triphthong, but sometimes is a syllabic consonant.

It has been suggested that if a language allows a type of consonants to occur in syllable nucleus, it will also allow all the consonant types that are higher in sonority, that is, a language with syllabic fricatives would necessarily also have syllabic nasals, and that syllabic obstruents will be much more rare than liquids; both statements have been shown to be false.

In most Germanic languages, lax vowels can occur only in closed syllables. Therefore, these vowels are also called checked vowels, as opposed to the tense vowels that are called free vowels because they can occur even in open syllables.

==== Consonant nucleus ====
Some languages allow obstruents to occur in the syllable nucleus without any intervening vowel or sonorant. The most common syllabic consonants are sonorants like [l], [r], [m], [n] or [ŋ], as in English bottle or in Slovak krv [krv]. However, English allows syllabic obstruents in a few para-verbal onomatopoeic utterances such as shh (used to command silence) and psst (used to attract attention). All of these have been analyzed as phonemically syllabic. Obstruent-only syllables also occur phonetically in some prosodic situations when unstressed vowels elide between obstruents, as in potato [pʰˈteɪɾəʊ] and today [tʰˈdeɪ], which do not change in their number of syllables despite losing a syllabic nucleus.

A few languages have so-called syllabic fricatives, also known as fricative vowels, at the phonemic level. (In the context of Chinese phonology, the related but non-synonymous term apical vowel is commonly used.) Mandarin Chinese allows such sounds in at least some of its dialects, for example the pinyin syllables sī shī rī, usually pronounced [sź̩ ʂʐ̩́ ʐʐ̩́], respectively. Though, like the nucleus of rhotic English church, there is debate over whether these nuclei are consonants or vowels.

Some languages of the North American Pacific Northwest, including members of the Salishan, Wakashan and Chinookan families, allow obstruents to behave as syllable nuclei. An example is Chinook [ɬtʰpʰt͡ʃʰkʰtʰ] 'those two women are coming this way out of the water'. Syllabic obstruents used to be considered very rare, but surveys have shown that they are relatively common and might even be more common than syllabic liquids.

Some examples from Nuxalk:

- clhpʼxwlhtlhplhhs kwtsʼ /çɬpʼχʷɬtɬpɬːs kʷt͡sʼ/
  - 'then she/he had a bunchberry plant'
- kʼclhhtscw slhxwtlhhts /cʼçɬːt͡sxʷ sɬχʷtɬːt͡s/
  - 'you had seen me go through the passage'
- lhxwtlhtscw /ɬχʷtɬt͡sxʷ/
  - 'you spat on me'
- tsʼkts kwtsʼ /t͡sʼcts kʷt͡sʼ/
  - 'he arrived'

In Bagemihl's survey of previous analyses, he finds that the Nuxalk phrase tsʼkts kwtsʼ would have been parsed into 0, 2, 3, 5, or 6 syllables depending on which analysis is used. One analysis would consider all vowel and consonant segments as syllable nuclei, another would consider only a small subset (fricatives or sibilants) as nuclei candidates, and another would simply deny the existence of syllables completely. However, when working with recordings rather than transcriptions, the syllables can be obvious in such languages, and native speakers have strong intuitions as to what the syllables are.

This type of phenomenon has also been reported in Berber languages (such as Indlawn Tashlhiyt Berber), Mon–Khmer languages (such as Semai, Temiar, Khmu) and the Ōgami dialect of Miyako, a Ryukyuan language.

Indlawn Tashlhiyt Berber
[tftktst tfktstt] 'you sprained it and then gave it'
[rkkm] 'rot' (imperf.)
Semai
[kckmrʔɛːc] 'short, fat arms'

Languages with long sequences of obstruents pose a problem to several models of the syllable.

=== Coda ===
The coda (also known as auslaut) comprises the consonant sounds of a syllable that follow the nucleus. The sequence of nucleus and coda is called a rime. Some syllables consist of only a nucleus, only an onset and a nucleus with no coda, or only a nucleus and coda with no onset.

The phonotactics of many languages forbid syllable codas. Examples are Swahili and Hawaiian. In others, codas are restricted to a small subset of the consonants that appear in onset position. At a phonemic level in Japanese, for example, a coda may only be a nasal (homorganic with any following consonant) or, in the middle of a word, gemination of the following consonant. (On a phonetic level, other codas occur due to elision of /i/ and /ɯ/.) In other languages, nearly any consonant allowed as an onset is also allowed in the coda, even clusters of consonants. In English, for example, all onset consonants except /h/ are allowed as syllable codas.

If the coda consists of a consonant cluster, the sonority typically decreases from first to last, as in the English word help. This is called the sonority hierarchy (or sonority scale). English onset and coda clusters are therefore different. The onset /str/ in strengths does not appear as a coda in any English word. However, some clusters do occur as both onsets and codas, such as /st/ in stardust. The sonority hierarchy is more strict in some languages and less strict in others.

==== Open and closed ====
A coda-less syllable of the form V, CV, CCV, etc. (V = vowel, C = consonant) is called an open syllable or free syllable, while a syllable that has a coda (VC, CVC, CVCC, etc.) is called a closed syllable or checked syllable. These are not the same definitions of "open" and "close" as in open and close vowels, but are defined according to the phoneme that ends the syllable: a vowel (open syllable) or a consonant (closed syllable). Almost all languages allow open syllables, but some, such as Hawaiian and Igbo, do not have closed syllables.

When a syllable is not the last syllable in a word, the nucleus normally must be followed by two consonants in order for the syllable to be closed. This is because a single following consonant is typically considered the onset of the following syllable. For example, Spanish casar ("to marry") is composed of an open syllable followed by a closed syllable (ca-sar), whereas cansar "to become tired" is composed of two closed syllables (can-sar). When a geminate (double) consonant occurs, the syllable boundary occurs in the middle, e.g. Italian panna "cream" (pan-na); cf. Italian pane "bread" (pa-ne).

English words may consist of a single closed syllable, with nucleus denoted by ν, and coda denoted by κ:

- in: ν = /ɪ/, κ = /n/
- cup: ν = /ʌ/, κ = /p/
- tall: ν = /ɔː/, κ = /l/
- milk: ν = /ɪ/, κ = /lk/
- tints: ν = /ɪ/, κ = /nts/
- fifths: ν = /ɪ/, κ = /fθs/
- sixths: ν = /ɪ/, κ = /ksθs/
- twelfths: ν = /ɛ/, κ = /lfθs/
- strengths: ν = /ɛ/, κ = /ŋθs/

English words may also consist of a single open syllable, ending in a nucleus, without a coda:

- glue, ν = /uː/
- pie, ν = /aɪ/
- though, ν = /oʊ/
- boy, ν = /ɔɪ/

This is not true for all languages. Many languages (about 12%) do not permit closed syllables. It is very rare for a language to not allow open syllables, but Arrernte may be one such language.

==== Null coda ====
Some languages forbid codas, so that all syllables are open. Examples are Hawaiian from the Austronesian family, and Swahili from the Atlantic–Congo family.

== Suprasegmental features ==
The domain of suprasegmental features is a syllable (or some larger unit), but not a specific sound. That is to say, these features may affect more than a single segment, and possibly all segments of a syllable:

- Stress
- Tone
- Stød
- Suprasegmental palatalization

Sometimes syllable length is also counted as a suprasegmental feature; for example, in some Germanic languages, long vowels may only exist with short consonants and vice versa. However, syllables can be analyzed as compositions of long and short phonemes, as in Finnish and Japanese, where consonant gemination and vowel length are independent.

=== Tone ===
In most languages, the pitch or pitch contour in which a syllable is pronounced conveys shades of meaning such as emphasis or surprise, or distinguishes a statement from a question. In tonal languages, however, the pitch affects the basic lexical meaning (e.g. "cat" vs. "dog") or grammatical meaning (e.g. past vs. present). In some languages, only the pitch itself (e.g. high vs. low) has this effect, while in others, especially East Asian languages such as Chinese, Thai or Vietnamese, the shape or contour (e.g. level vs. rising vs. falling) also needs to be distinguished.

=== Accent ===
Syllable structure often interacts with stress or pitch accent. In Latin, for example, stress is regularly determined by syllable weight, a syllable counting as heavy if it has at least one of the following:

- a long vowel in its nucleus
- a diphthong in its nucleus
- one or more coda consonants

In each case, the syllable is considered to have two morae.

The first syllable of a word is the initial syllable and the last syllable is the final syllable.

In languages accented on one of the last three syllables, the last syllable is called the ultima, the next-to-last is called the penult, and the third syllable from the end is called the antepenult. These terms come from Latin ultima "last", paenultima "almost last", and antepaenultima "before almost last".

In Ancient Greek, there are three accent marks (acute, circumflex, and grave), and terms were used to describe words based on the position and type of accent. Some of these terms are used in the description of other languages.

		Placement of accent		
		Antepenult	Penult	Ultima
Type of accent	Circumflex	—	properispomenon	perispomenon
Type of accent	Acute	proparoxytone	paroxytone	oxytone
Type of accent	Any	barytone		—

== Crosslinguistic patterns ==
CV is purported to be the universal syllable type that is found in all languages of the world, although two Australian languages, Arrernte and the Oykangand dialect of Kunjen, are possible exceptions. CV is the first syllable type to be acquired by children, and if a language has only one type of a syllable, it is always CV (e.g. Hawaiian and Hua).

Several asymmetries in onset and coda have been identified. All languages have syllables with onsets, but about 12.6% of languages in WALS do not allow codas. The list of consonants allowed in the coda is usually smaller than the ones allowed in the onset (e.g. in Northern Germany, there is no contrast between voiceless and voiced consonants in codas). All combinations of onset and nucleus are usually allowed, but the coda consonant is sometimes restricted by the nucleus.

Consonant clusters are more typical in onsets than in codas.

=== Antepenult, penult, and ultima ===
Penult is a linguistics term for the second-to-last syllable of a word. It is an abbreviation of penultimate, which describes the next-to-last item in a series. The penult follows the antepenult (third-to-last syllable) and precedes the ultima (last syllable). For example, the main stress falls on the penult in such English words as banána, and Mississíppi, and just about all words ending in -ic such as músic, frántic, and phonétic. Occasionally, "penult" refers to the last word but one of a sentence.

The terms are often used in reference to languages like Latin and Ancient Greek, whose position of the pitch accent or stress of a word falls only on one of the last three syllables, and sometimes in discussing poetic meter. In certain languages, such as Welsh and Polish, stress is always on the penult.

== Morphology ==
Complex syllables often occur as a result of morphological processes (e.g. the English word "texts" has an uncommon coda /kst-s/ after pluralisation). Some models of the syllable even exclude morphologically complex syllables from their analysis. At the same time, these clusters are acquired earlier by L1 speakers than the ones arising within a single morpheme, and are less reduced.

== See also ==
- English phonology § Phonotactics
- Line (poetry)
- List of the longest English words with one syllable
- Minor syllable
- Syllabary
- Syllable (computing)
- Timing (linguistics)
- Vocalese
