= Denis Creissels =

French linguist

Denis Creissels (born 18 September 1943) is a French professor of linguistics at the University of Lyon.

After studying mathematics and Russian, he taught general linguistics at the University of Grenoble from 1970 to 1996, and at the University of Lyon from 1996 to 2008. He is now professor emeritus at the University of Lyon, and member of the research team Dynamique du Langage.

He is specialised in languages of Africa and the Caucasus. He has done extensive research on Hungarian, Tswana, Malinke and Akhvakh.

His 1995 and 2006 books on syntax are widely used as textbooks in linguistic typology and syntax in French-speaking universities.

He has taught as invited professor at the Summer School on Linguistic Typology in Leipzig in 2010.

== Monographs ==
- 2009 Le malinké de Kita. Cologne : Rüdiger Köppe.Rüdiger Köppe Verlag
- 2006 Syntaxe générale, une introduction typologique. Paris : Hermès. (2 vol., 412 p. & 334 p.)
- 1997 (en collaboration avec A.M. Chebanne et H.W. Nkhwa) Tonal morphology of the Setswana verb. Munich : LINCOM Europa. 227 p.
- 1995 Éléments de syntaxe générale. Presses Universitaires de France. 332 p.
- 1994 Aperçu sur les structures phonologiques des langues négro-africaines, 2ème édition entièrement revue et complétée. Grenoble : Éditions Littéraires et Linguistiques de l’Université de Grenoble. 320 p.
- 1991 Description des langues négro-africaines et théorie syntaxique. Grenoble : Éditions Littéraires et Linguistiques de l’Université de Grenoble, 466 p.
- 1989 Aperçu sur les structures phonologiques des langues négro-africaines, 1ère édition. Grenoble : Éditions Littéraires et Linguistiques de l’Université de Grenoble. 288 p.
- 1983 Éléments de grammaire de la langue mandinka. Grenoble : Publications de l’Université des Langues et Lettres de Grenoble. 223 p.
- 1979 (en collaboration avec N. Kouadio) Les tons du baoulé (parler de la région de Toumodi). Abidjan : Institut de Linguistique Appliquée. 123 p.
- 1977 (en collaboration avec N. Kouadio) Description phonologique et grammaticale d’un parler baoulé. Abidjan : Institut de Linguistique Appliquée. 642 p.
