= Ersu Shaba script =

Writing system

Ersu Shaba
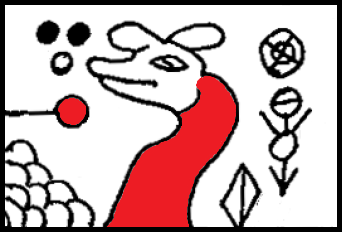
- Script type: Pictographic
- Period: ca. 1000–1500 CE to present
- Languages: Ersu

The Ersu Shaba script, also called Ersu Shaba Picture Writing and known in Ersu as [ndzārāmá], is the writing system used in texts of the indigenous religion of the Ersu people, which is rendered in Chinese as Shābā (沙巴). These scriptures are recited in divination and when treating the sick. The script is used for non-scriptural texts as well, such as astrological almanacs, but predominantly ones which concern religion. Only Shaba priests are literate in the script.

The script is predominantly pictographic. It is limited in scope and is not sufficient to write the Ersu language fully. Some 200 glyphs have been identified, most of them depicting (and resembling) concrete objects. These are combined into composite diagrams. The system is (proto-)writing, as the relationship between form and meaning is fixed: Although glyphs may be written simply or elaborately, they may not be chosen at the author's whim, and pronunciation and interpretation is consistent across the several counties of the Ersu-speaking area. However, it typically takes many words to explain a few glyphs; the connection to language is definite in the object depicted, but the position and context of the glyphs does not have a fixed linguistic correlation.

Writing is done with a bamboo brush or animal hair dipped in white, black, red, blue, green, and yellow-colored ink. The color chosen may affect the meaning. For example, the glyph 'stars and moon' written in black means 'dim', but written in white it means 'shining' (Sun 2009:165).

== Sample text ==
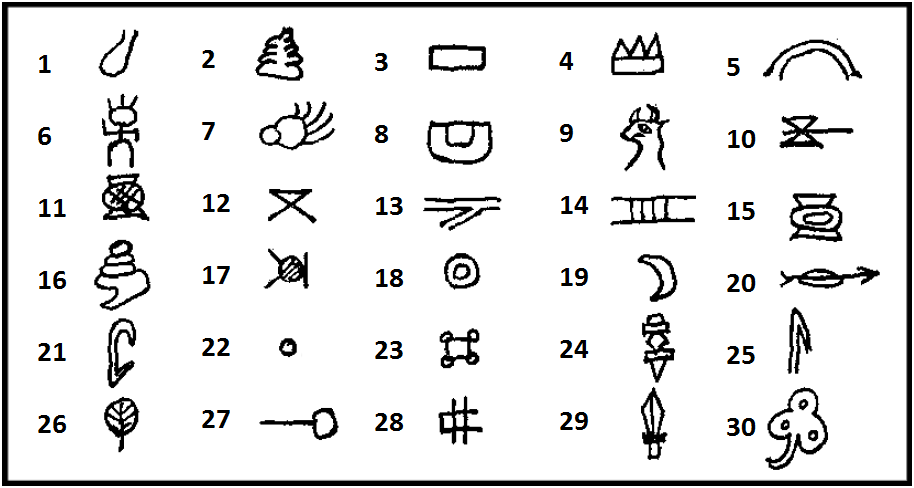
A sample of Ersu Shaba glyphs.

Key: Pronunciation and meaning
1 hkɛ́nuá pouch	2 htuakʰú flame	3 tɕipá plank	4 ntʃʰopa tray with food	5 dzí bridge
6 váʴtʂʰá slave's ghost	7 jawa sp. instrument	8 ʐu demon's cage	9 ŋuaʴ bovine	10 vútsʰuá axe
11 sátípunba decorated jar	12 htótʂʰɛ́ tripod	13 ʐ̩́katsá fork in road	14 tsuajá stretcher	15 pʰɛnɡú jar
16 ə́ʴbɛ white conch	17 pś̩má frog	18 ɲómá Sun	19 ɬápʰɛ́ Moon	20 ndamáʴ arrow
21 nkʰuájí fishhook	22 tʂ̩́ star	23 bapʰu shield	24 npʰópá sp. instrument	25 sípútʰɛhkɛ́ tree broken by wind
26 sípś̩ oak leaf	27 tsá jug	28 ʐoḿ̩dź̩ ghost	29 tsʰintʃʰá ritual knife	30 jiʐ̩́nuapu sp. constellation

Following is a reading and explanation of the frame from a Shaba book illustrated at the top of the page.

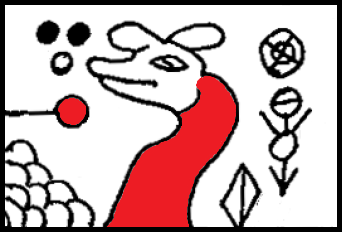

Reading:

The ninth day of the first lunar month, a dog day, will be a fire day. In the morning there will be fog under the earth. Before sunrise, clouds will appear in the sky. A tsʰintʃʰá sword and a npʰópá will appear afterwards. This means that the morning will be a good morning. After midday, two stars will die, only one of the three will still be shining and the sun will be in an abnormal condition. One can surmise that there is a deity under the earth; it is better not to move earth that day. (Sun 2009:173)

Explanation. (The reading is not in any particular order; the explanation will start with the glyph in the center and then go clockwise.)

In the center of the diagram is a dog's head, meaning it is a 'dog day'. The dog's body is red, meaning it's also a fire day. The combination means the ninth day of the first lunar month. At the bottom left is fog, meaning the morning will be foggy; if the fog were on the right, it would be in the evening. Above that is a red tsá jug with a handle (#27 in the table above); tsá jugs are used for alcohol, and the auspicious red color means that the drinking will be good on that day, meaning the day itself will be comparatively good. At the top left are three stars (22 above), two black and one white; a black star is dim, a white star shining. [Meaning unclear.] At top right is the Sun (18 above) crossed out in chains, meaning it will be hindered and the weather will not be good. The npʰópá (a religious implement) and the ritual tsʰintʃʰá knife, which can overcome negative forces, indicate that positive and negative forces will balance.

The Ersu text speaks of a 'white moon', meaning the first half of the month (a black moon is the second half of the month), but it is not clear how this is indicated. The earth deity is not directly mentioned, and must be inferred (Sun p 178).
