= Ersu language =

Qiangic language spoken in Sichuan, China

Ersu
- Native to: China
- Region: western Sichuan
- Native speakers: 20,000 (2002)
- Language family: Sino-Tibetan: Tibeto-Burman; Qiangic; Ersuic; Ersu
- Writing system: Ersu Shaba script

Language codes
- ISO 639-3: ers
- Glottolog: ersu1241
- ELP: Ersu

The Ersu language proper (Chinese: 尔苏 Ěrsū) is a Sino-Tibetan (Trans-Himalayan language) spoken in western Sichuan, China. It is the most widely spoken of the three Ersu languages. There are 13,000 speakers according to Sun (1982).

== Varieties ==
Yu (2012) lists three varieties of Ersu, all of which are spoken in southern Sichuan.

- Zeluo Ersu: Sun (1982, 1991) documents Ersu of Zela Township 则拉乡 (or Zeluo 则洛), Yutian District 玉田区, Ganluo County 甘洛县, Sichuan (Sun 1991:231).
- Qingshui Ersu: The Qingshui dialect of Ersu documented by Liu (1983) is spoken in Qingshui Village 清水村, Liaoping Township 廖坪乡, Ganluo County 甘洛县, Sichuan.
- Hanyuan Ersu (extinct): Ersu of Hanyuan County, Sichuan, which is now extinct, was documented in Baber (1882).

== Classification ==
In older literature, Ersu is categorized as a member of the southern subgroup of the Qiangic branch within the Trans-Himalayan language family. However, more recent work by Jacques & Michaud (2011) and Chirkova (2012) suggests that "the Qiangic group as defined is paraphyletic, as the only commonalities between these languages are either symplesiomorphies (common archaisms) or areal features spread through contact. At least Ersu/Lizu and Shixing should be excluded from the Qiangic group."

== History ==
There is generally few written records available in Ersu, therefore not much is known about the history of the people who spoke it. While it has been theorized that the Ersu people moved from Tibet, or were from neighbouring ethnic groups such as the Yi, there is some evidence that the Ersu predated even the Yi in settlement in that area. The Yi people who moved during the Tang Dynasty to the regions near where the Ersu resided documented the Ersu as "the aboriginals". Therefore, it is argued that the Ersu people's settlement in the place they can be found now must be no later than the beginning of the Tang Dynasty.

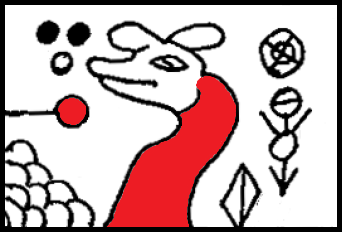

== Orthography ==
Most of the early Ersu people could not read or write since there are no written scripts to represent their vernacular language. The only ones who were literate were the religious practitioners called "Shaba".

Shaba were believed to "know everything in the sky above and the earth underneath", and possessed magical powers that allowed them to chant scriptures to call for rain or curse the enemies of the Ersu. They are still active in the Ersu communities to the present day. They are always present at important events such as festivals, weddings, and funerals.

They are also important most likely because they were the only group of people who were able to read the only form of written script found in Ersu history. It is currently known as Shaba pictographic script. Not much is known about the script, only that it used to be only taught from father to son (not daughter) in a Shaba family. Now, there are less than 10 people who can read the script and much fewer who can understand it in the region.

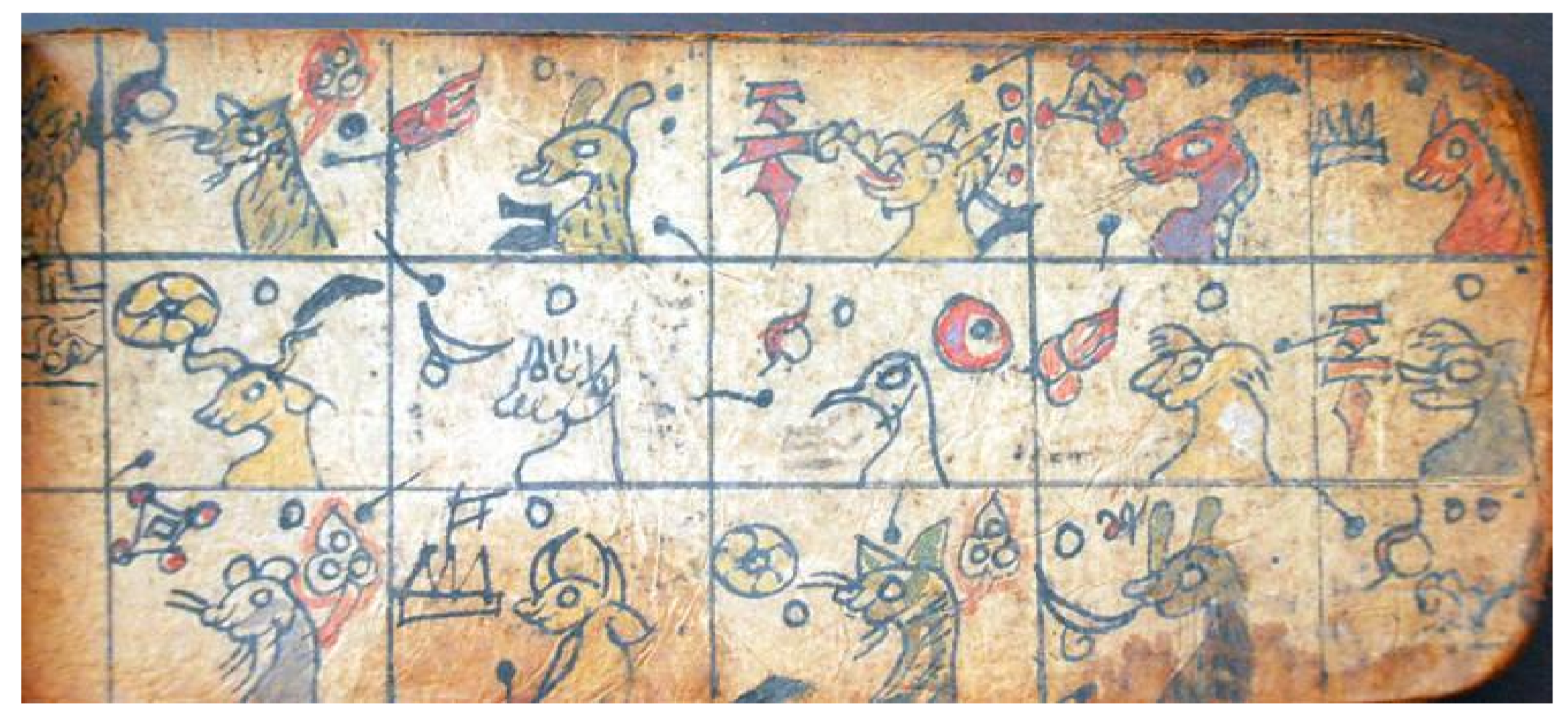

There are about 200 independent Shaba characters which are not directly linked to the Ersu people's spoken language, and one character may correspond with one or more syllables. Often it may take several lines of words to explain one character. Each aspect of the "picture" would convey a meaning. Different animals would usually indicate different months or dates. Colors also conveyed meaning. They often matched the "five elements" as follows: metal is dark, wood is green, water is dark grey, fire is red, and earth is yellow.

== Phonology ==
=== Consonants ===
Ersu has 37 simple initial consonants and 22 cluster initial consonants. Besides the ones found in Mandarin loanwords, there are no syllabic final consonants.

The following table shows the phonological system of speakers of about age 50 and younger. All the sounds represented below are word initial except the nasals, which can also occasionally be used as an independent syllable.

		Labial	Alveolar		Post- alveolar	Alveolo- palatal	Retroflex	Velar	Glottal
		Labial	plain	sibilant	Post- alveolar	Alveolo- palatal	Retroflex	Velar	Glottal
Nasal		m	n			ɲ		ŋ	
Plosive	voiceless	p	t	ts		tɕ	ʈʂ	k	ʔ
Plosive	aspirated	pʰ	tʰ	tsʰ		tɕʰ	ʈʂʰ	kʰ	
Plosive	voiced	b	d	dz		dʑ	ɖʐ	ɡ	
Fricative	voiceless	f	ɬ	s		ɕ	ʂ	x	
Fricative	voiced	v		z	ʒ	ʑ	ʐ		
Approximant		w	l			j			

There are 22 cluster initials, eighteen of which are composed of two consonants and four are composed of 3 consonants. They are as follows:

Ersu Cluster Initials
		Labial	Alveolar	Alveolo- palatal	Retroflex	Velar
Plosive	voiceless aspirated	npʰ	ntʰ			nkʰ
Plosive	voiced	nb	nd			nɡ
Affricate	voiceless aspirated		ntsʰ	ntɕʰ	nʈʂʰ	
Affricate	voiced		ndz	ndʑ	nɖʐ	
Fricative	voiceless aspirated		ps, pʰs, npʰs		pʂ, pʰʂ, npʰʂ	
Fricative	voiced		bz, nbz		bʐ, nbʐ	

There are also some restrictions on what vowels the cluster initials can precede and are generally more limited than the number of vowels that the simple consonants can precede.

Cluster initial consonants and vowels
Cluster initial	Vowel
/nbʰ/	/ɑ/, /o/, /u/, /ɛ/, /i/
/nb/	/ɑ/, /o/, /u/, /ɛ/, /i/
/ntʰ/	/ɑ/, /o/, /u/, /uɑ/
/nd/	/ɑ/, /o/, /ə/, /i/
/ntsʰ/	/ɑ/, /o/, /u/, /ɛ/, /ɿ/
/ndz/	/ɑ/, /ɑʴ/, /u/, /ə/, /ɛ/, /i/, /ɿ/
/ntɕʰ/	/ɑ/, /o/, /i/
/ndʑ/	/o/, /i/
/nkʰ/	/ɑ/, /ə/, /u/
/ng/	/ɑ/, /o/, /u/, /ə/
/ntʂʰ/	/ɑ/, /u/, /ə/, /ɿ/
/ndʐ/	/ɑ/, /o/, /u/, /ɿ/
/ps/, /pʰs/, /npʰs/, /bz/, /nbz/, /pʂ/, /pʰʂ/, /npʰʂ/, /bʐ/, /nbʐ/	/ɿ/

More on allophones of these consonants can be found in Zhang, S.'s 2013 dissertation.

=== Vowels ===
Their vowel system includes seven basic vowels, three rhotic vowels, six diphthongs, and one triphthong. Ersu does not have nasalized vowels, however, there are nasalized vowels in loan words from Chinese. There are no long vowels.

The seven basic vowels are: /i/, /y/, /u/, /ɛ/, /ə/, /ɑ/ and /o/. The three rhotic vowels are: /ɑʴ/, /əʴ/, and /oʴ/.

There are also six diphthongs, three rising and three falling. The three rising diphthongs are /iɛ/, /iɑ/ and /uɑ/. The three falling diphthongs end with a less prominent front vowel /i/, but begin with a more prominent vowel. They are: /ui/, /ɛi/, and /ɑi/. All of the diphthongs besides /uɑ/ are not frequently found in Ersu, only in a few individual words. /uɑ/ is found in a large number of words, following a variety of consonant initials such as /kʰ/, /k/, /n/, /ŋ/, /l/, /tsʰ/, /ʂ/, and /x/.

/uɑo/ is the only triphthong found in Ersu, and only to exist in one word [zuɑo] 'bowl'.

=== Syllable Structure and Types ===
The basic syllable pattern is CV. C can be a single consonant or consonant cluster. V can be a single vowel, diphthong, or triphthong. Native words of Ersu do not contain coda consonants. Each syllable will have a nucleus that is a vowel, diphthong, or triphthong, and very rarely a syllabic nasal.

Often a syllable can be simply V or C. The vowels /ɑ/, /ɑ^{ɹ}/ and /ə^{ɹ}/ can function as a syllable V. Nasals /m/, /n/, and /ŋ/ can also form independent syllables as C, however they are much rarer.

Lastly, there is the NCV pattern, which refers to nasalized syllables, where the N stands for a nasal /n/ or /m/. The rest of the structure is the same as the basic CV structure above.

=== Tones ===
The tone bearing unit is a syllable, and each syllable is obligatorily assigned a tone. There are two tones with contrastive minimal pairs found in Ersu; high level, and mid level. The assignment of the tones in a particular morpheme or word is unpredictable, though data suggests that the high level tone is much more frequent than the mid level tone. The pitch contour of the Ersu tones is also much less stable/consistent compared to Mandarin Chinese, and often have contextual variation.

Below is an example of the contrastive minimal pairs of words with tonal differences. [`] marks the mid level tone, and nothing marks the high level tone.

Ersu tone comparison of minimal pairs
High level tone		Mid level tone	
Example	Gloss	Example	Gloss
ȵo	day	ȵò	bronze
nbo	deaf	nbò	horse
ŋuɑ	silver	ŋuɑ̀	ox
si	three	sɪ̀	only
sɛ	who	sɛ̀bɛ̀	plum
yo	sheep	yò	1sg.OTR
zo	targeted	zò	four
ʂɿ	taste	ʂɿ̀	meat
tʂu	bean	tʂù	take out
dɑ-bɑ	be full	dɑ̀-bɑ̀	carry ... on one's back
tɑ	shut (door)	tɑ̀	emasculated sheep
tu	hold against	tù	mortar
du	wild cat	dù	plow
tsʰɛ̀	wash	tsʰɛ	drink
gu	kick	gù	boat
kɑ	CL:generic	kɑ̀tsʰɿ̀	idiot
tsə	cloud	tsə̀	hemp
dzo	water	dzò	wok
fu	village	fù	garlic
so	die	sò	blood
ʂə	iron	ʂə̀	louse
ʂɿʂɿ	weasel	ʂɿ̀ʂɿ̀	walk
mɑ	delicious	mɑ̀	blow
mo	corpse	mò	(animals) bark
mɛ	troop	mɛ̀	fire
nbu	hay	nbù	hat
ndzo	leopard	ndzò	MOD: knowing how to
ngə	seed	ngə̀	nine
vu	alcohol	vù	head
ȵi	gold	ȵɪ̀	sickness
la	chick	lɑ̀	deer
ntʂʰə	quick	ntɕʰə̀	pull
ndzɑ	drum	ndzɑ̀	Han people

=== Loanword Phonology ===
There is strong evidence that Tibetan and Yi words have been borrowed into Ersu without adaptation. Some of the words have exactly the same pronunciation as the Tibetan or Yi words. There is some contention as to whether or not this is good enough evidence to say that Ersu people belong to the Tibetan nationality.

There is also a large amount of Mandarin words borrowed into the Ersu language. These words mainly come from the dialect in Mandarin that carries the tone systems of Southwestern Mandarin varieties, henceforth referred to as "Mandarin". According to Zhang, the majority of Mandarin loanwords occur in the texts relevant to modern times such as long conversations, procedural and autobiographical narratives. In a historical context, Mandarin is hardly seen, even as late as the 1980s.

Ersu generally utilize Mandarin words in two different ways:

1. Mandarin is directly borrowed without any adaptation, and is rather obvious. This leads to the use of nasalized vowels that are borrowed from Mandarin to appear in Ersu everyday speech, though it is not originally a part of their phonemic inventory.
2. They assimilate Mandarin into Ersu by making the former sound very much like Ersu. This applies to words that have been borrowed for a longer time, and also the speech of the older Ersu speakers over 70 years old. Below are methods that Ersu adapts Mandarin words.

Mandarin adaptation into Ersu
Pre-loan (pinyin)	Post-loan (Ersu)	Meaning
diɑ̀ngān	diɑ́kɑ̀	(electrical) pole
yɑ́nghuǒ	yɑ̀kò	match
dɑ̀gē	tɑ̀kò	eldest brother
gɑ̄nluò	kɑ̀lò	Ganluo (county)

- Nasals in the coda of Mandarin are deleted when adapted, most likely due to the lack of codas in native Ersu.
- When there are diphthongs in Mandarin that are also in Ersu, they are directly borrowed. However, for the diphthongs that are in Mandarin and not in Ersu, only one of the vowels in the Mandarin diphthong is kept. Usually only the back vowel is kept. ex. /uo/ in Mandarin is adapted to keep the /o/ in the Ersu lexicon.
- /ə/ and /ɤ/ in Mandarin always becomes /o/ in Ersu.
- All the tones in Mandarin are transformed to the mid level tone in Ersu.
- Two notable exceptions are the adaptations of Mandarin words for 'duck' and 'goose'. They are open syllables in Mandarin, but are adapted with a nasalized coda and a stressed glottal stop at the onset of the word.

== Nouns ==
Nouns in Ersu are either monomorphemic or compounded and can be derived from verbs or verb phrases through nominalization. Nominalizers come in the form of markers on words such as the agentive marker su, purposive marker li, temporal/locative marker ʂə`, and the instrumental/locative marker ta. Many kinship terms and directional terms take an ɑ-prefix. They may also bear case markers such as the genitive marker yɪ, accusative marker vɑ, comitative marker p^{h}ɛ, etc. Finally there are six relator nouns found in Ersu that follow a head noun and denote either locative or temporal concepts.

== Numeral system ==
Cardinal numbers from 1-10
Number	Meaning
tə	one
nə	two
si	three
zò	four
ŋuà	five
tsʰu	six
sɿn̩	seven
ʒɿ	eight
ngə	nine
tsʰɛtsʰɛ	ten

There are ten cardinal numerals 1-10 and the remainder being compound numerals. Unlike many other languages, Ersu does not have a "zero":

Compound numerals are formed for those numbers larger than ten. However, it is not just the sum of the cardinal numbers together to form the larger numbers.

- numbers from 10 to 19 use base tsʰɛ (ten)
- numbers from 20 to 39 use base tsʰɿ (ten)
- numbers from 40 to 99 use base zɿ (ten)
- numbers larger than 100 are compounds often with three bases and there exists no base greater than ten thousand.

Cardinal numbers from 10-19
Number	Composition	Meaning
tsʰɛ+tsɿ	ten (combining form) + sole	eleven
tsʰɛ+nə	ten (combining form) + two	twelve
tsʰɛ+si	ten (combining form) + three	thirteen
tsʰɛ+zò	ten (combining form) + four	fourteen
tsʰɛ+ŋuà	ten (combining form) + five	fiveteen
tsʰɛ+tsʰu	ten (combining form) + six	sixteen
tsʰɛ+sɿn̩	ten (combining form) + seven	seventeen
tsʰɛ+ʒɿ	ten (combining form) + eight	eighteen
tsʰɛ+ngə	ten (combining form) + nine	nineteen

Composition of numbers from 20-39
Number	Composition	Meaning
nə + tsʰɿ	two + ten (combining form)	twenty
nə + tsʰɿ + tə	two + ten (combining form) + one	twenty-one
nə + tsʰɿ + nə	two + ten (combining form) + two	twenty-two
nə + tsʰɿ + si	two + ten (combining form) + three	twenty-three
...
sa + tsʰɿ	three + ten (combining form)	thirty
sa + tsʰɿ + tə	three + ten (combining form) + one	thirty-one
sa + tsʰɿ + nə	three + ten (combining form) + two	thirty-two
sa + tsʰɿ + si	three + ten (combining form) + three	thirty-three

Bases for numbers greater than 100
Base	Meaning
zɑ	hundred
tu	thousand
nbotsʰo	ten thousand

Process of creating a complex number
Root	Meaning	Type
tsʰu	six	simple number
nbotsʰo	ten thousand	base
sɿn̩	seven	simple number
tu	thousand	base
ʒɿ	eight	simple number
zɑ	hundred	base
nə	two	simple number
zɿ	ten (combining form)	base
si	three	simple number
tsʰu + nbotsʰo + sɿn̩ + tu + ʒɿ + zɑ + nə + zɿ + si = 67823
