= Obstruent =

Speech sound formed by obstructing airflow

In phonetics, an obstruent (/ˈɒbstruːənt/, OB-stroo-ənt) is a speech sound that is formed by obstructing airflow, such as [d] (plosives/oral stops), [ʒ] (fricatives), or [d͡ʒ] (affricates). Obstruents contrast with sonorants (also known as resonants), which have no such obstruction and therefore are "sonorous" and "resonate". All obstruents are consonants, but sonorants include vowels as well as consonants. As a distinctive feature, obstruents are denoted as [−son].

Compare occlusives, a class of speech sounds which includes both oral and nasal stops as well as affricates, but excludes fricatives, and contrasts with continuants.

== Subclasses ==
Obstruents are subdivided into:

- plosives (oral stops), such as [p, b], with complete occlusion of the vocal tract, often followed by a release burst;
- fricatives, such as [s, z], with limited closure, not stopping airflow but making it turbulent;
- affricates, which begin with complete occlusion but then release into a fricative-like release, such as [t͡s] and [d͡z].

== Voicing ==
Obstruents are often prototypically voiceless, but voiced obstruents are common. This contrasts with sonorants, which are prototypically voiced and only rarely phonemically voiceless.

== See also ==
- List of phonetics topics

== Bibliography ==
- Ian Maddieson (1984). Patterns of Sounds. Cambridge University Press. ISBN 0-521-26536-3.
- Ladefoged, Peter; Maddieson, Ian (1996). The Sounds of the World's Languages. Oxford: Blackwell. ISBN 0-631-19815-6.
