= List of volcanoes in Vanuatu =

This is a list of active and extinct volcanoes in Vanuatu.

== Volcanoes ==
Name	Elevation (metres)	Elevation (feet)	Location	Last eruption
Ambae	1496	4908	15.380°S 167.83°E	2017
Ambrym	1334	4375	16.25°S 168.12°E	ongoing
Aneityum	852	2795	20.20°S 169.83°E	Pleistocene
East Epi	-34	-111	16.68°S 168.37°E	2004
Eastern Gemini Seamount	-80	-262	20.98°S 170.29°E	1996
Futuna	666	2185	19.32°S 170.13°E	Pleistocene
Gaua	979	2614	14.27°S 167.50°E	1982
Kutali	833	2733	16.73°S 168.28°E	-
Kuwae	-2	-7	16.829°S 168.536°E	1974
Lopevi	1413	4636	16.50°S 168.34°E	2006
Makura	644	2113	17.0°S 168.5°E	-
Merelava	883	3373	14.45°S 168.05°E	1606
Mota Lava	411	1348	13.7°S 167.65°E	300,000 BC
North Vate	594	1949	17.45°S 168.33°E	Holocene
Traitor's Head	837	2746	18.75°S 168.33°E	1881
Tavai Ruro	554	1818	16.80°S 168.43°E	-
Unnamed Caldera	521	1709	16.992°S 168.592°E	Holocene
Ureparapara	764	2507	13.54°S 167.33°E	476,000 BC
Vanua Lava	921	3022	13.80°S 167.47°E	1965
Vot Tande	64	210	13.25°S 167.65°E	4 million years ago
Western Gemini Seamount	-30	-98	21.0°S 170.05°E	-
Yasur	405	1329	19.52°S 169.42°E	ongoing

== See also ==
- Lists of volcanoes
