= Tasmate =

Tasmate is the name of several places in Vanuatu.

== Etymology ==
The term Tasmate means etymologically "dead sea" (from Proto-Oceanic *tasik 'sea', *mate 'dead'); it refers to places on the coast where the sea is quieter, and makes landing easier.

In the Proto-Torres–Banks language, ancestral to Mota and Mwerlap, it can be reconstructed as *tasimate.

== Geography ==
The name may refer to the following entities:

- Tasmate (Santo), a village on the west coast of Espiritu Santo [15.1582°S 166.6382°E]
  - Tasmate language, the language spoken in that village
- Tasmate (Mota), a village on the island of Mota [13.8539°S 167.6843°E]
- Tesmet (Merelava) (form taken by the name Tasmate in the local Mwerlap language), a village on the island of Merelava [14.4574°S 168.0223°E]
