= Vot Tande =

Vot Tande (Vet Tagde)
- Island
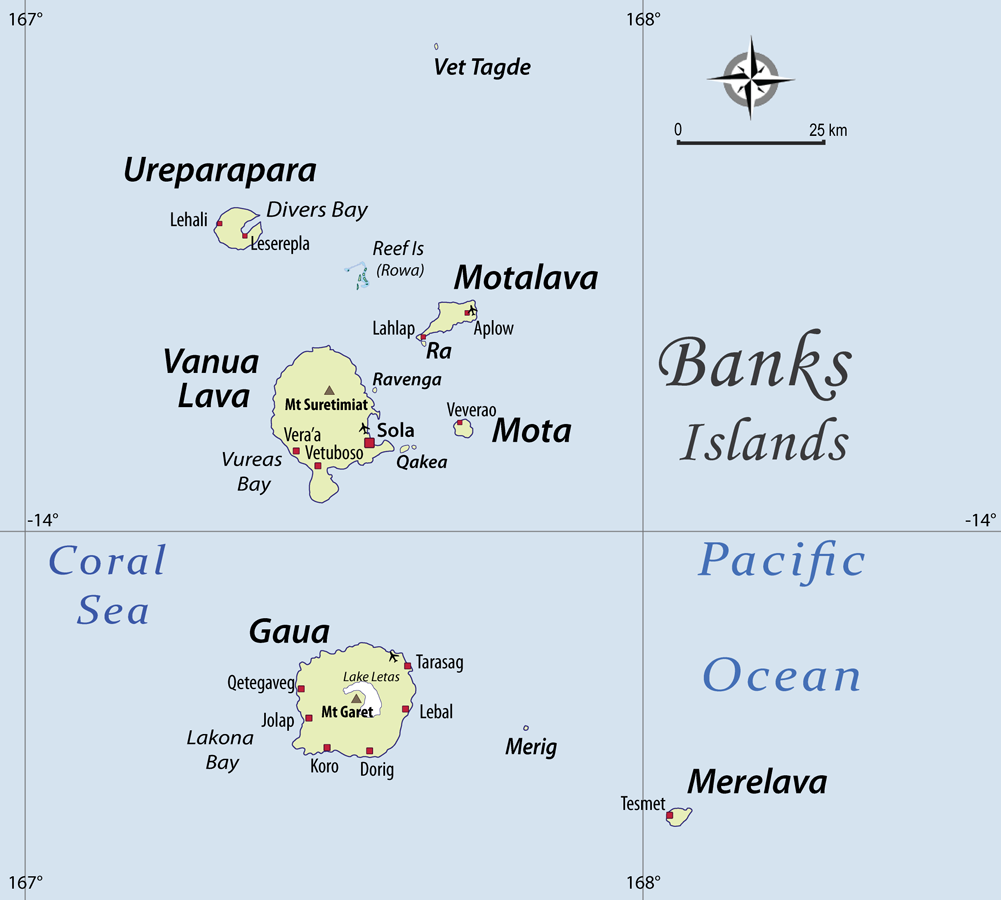
- Location of Vot Tande in Banks Islands

- Location in Vanuatu
- Coordinates: 13°15′35″S 167°38′32″E
- Country: Vanuatu
- Province: Torba Province

Area
  - Total: 0.24 km^{2} (0.093 sq mi)
- Elevation: 64 m (210 ft)

Population (2009)
  - Total: 26
  - Density: 110/km^{2} (280/sq mi)
- Time zone: UTC+11 (VUT)

Vot Tande [βɔt.taˈⁿdɛ] is an uninhabited islet of the Banks Islands of northern Vanuatu. It is located about 50 km (31 mi) due north of the island of Mota Lava. The islet of Vot Tande has never been inhabited. It is host to thousands of sea birds—especially frigatebirds, which have given their name to the islet. It consists of two islands. The highest point of either of the islands is 64 meters above sea level.

== Geography ==
The island is 800 m long and 300 m wide; its area is 0.24 km^{2}. At the northern end there is a wave cut platform being exposed at low tide and extends 100 m seawards. The latitude is 13.25º S, and the longitude is 167.65º E. The island frequently has cyclones and earthquakes.

== Name ==
The islet is known under various names, depending on which vernacular language is used. In all languages of the region, the meaning is the same: “the Rock of Frigatebirds”. Its reconstructed Proto-Torres-Banks name, based on the attested names below, is *βatu [ta]ɣaⁿdai, where *βatu means "stone" and *[ta]ɣaⁿdai means "frigatebird".

- In Löyöp (Ureparapara, formerly Rowa), it is called Vot Tade [βɔt.taˈⁿdɛ], with prenasalised [ⁿd]
- In Mwotlap (Mota Lava), it is known as Nevet Men Tagde [nɛˌβɛt.mɛn.taɰˈⁿdɛ], or under its older name Vet Tagde [βɛtaɰˈⁿdɛ].
- In Mota (Mota), it is called Vat Ganai [βat.ɣanai]

The spelling Vot Tande is a transcription of the Löyöp form. The variant Vetaoundé, which is found on old French maps, reflects an earlier attempt at spelling the older Mwotlap form. Other misspellings for the same islet include Vet Tande, Vot Ganai.
