= Rowa Islands =

Group of islands in Vanuatu

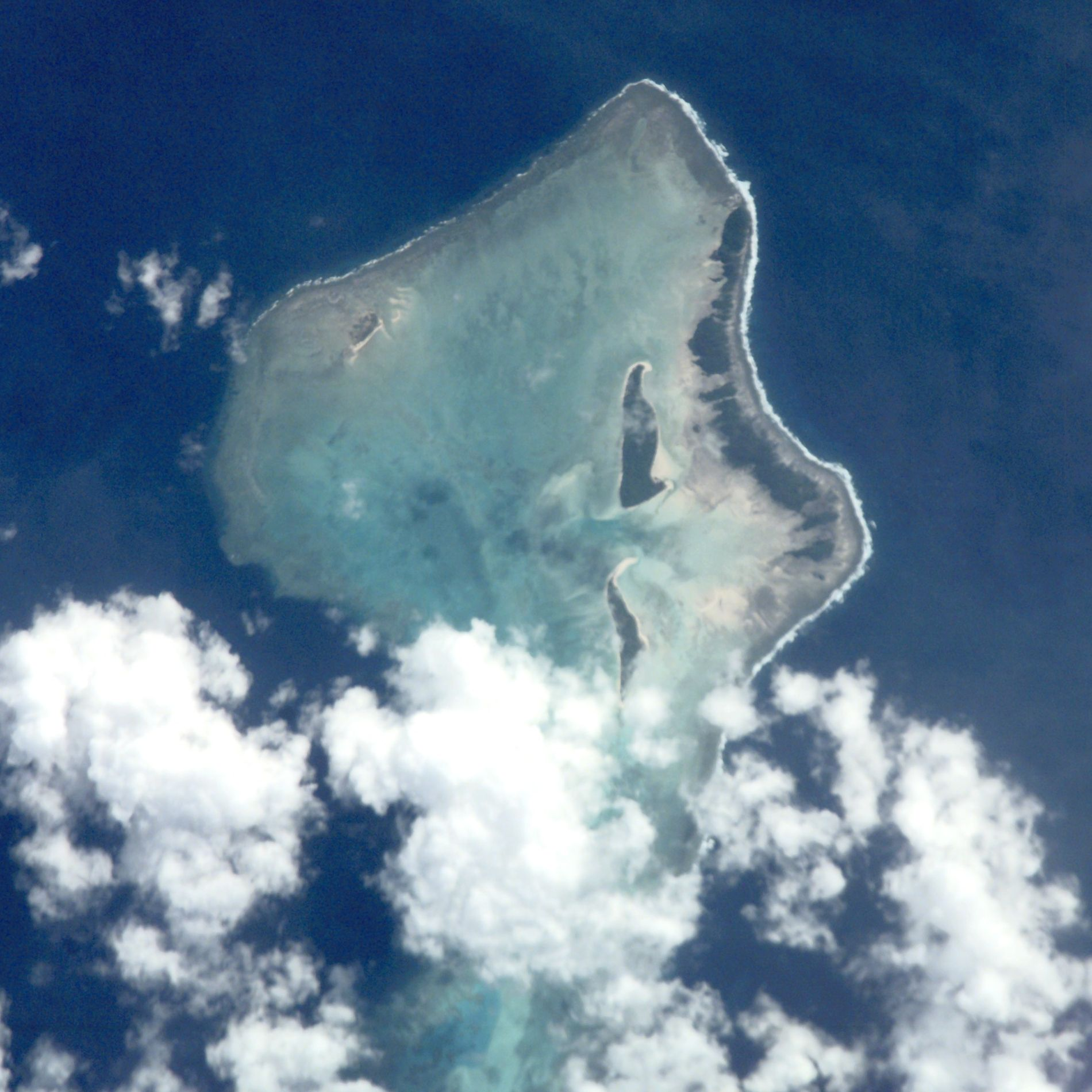
- Astronaut photo of Rowa Islands (2011).

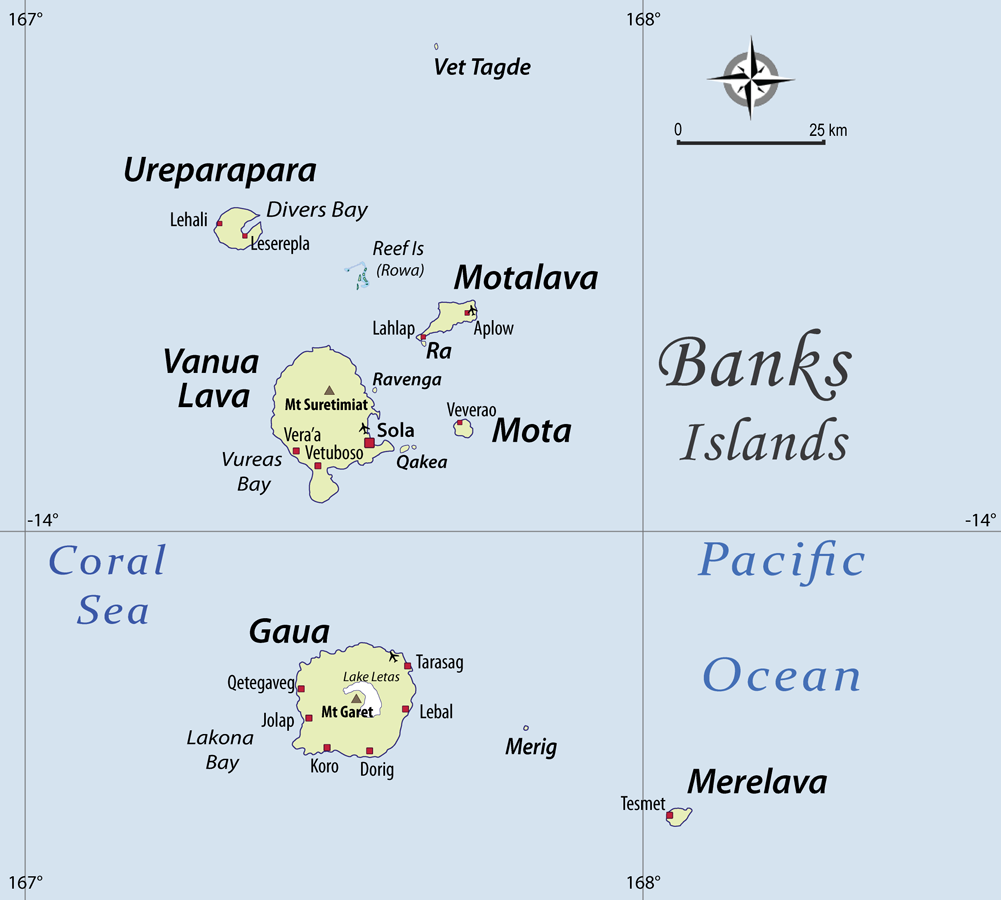

Geography
- Location: Pacific Ocean
- Coordinates: 13°37′00.0″S 167°31′59″E
- Archipelago: Vanuatu, Pacific Ocean
- Area: 2.0 km^{2} (0.77 sq mi)
- Highest elevation: 5 m (16 ft)

Administration
- Vanuatu
- Province: Torba Province

Demographics
- Population: 0 (2012)
- Ethnic groups: None

Rowa Islands (also known as Reef Islands) are an uninhabited archipelago in Torba Province of Vanuatu in the Pacific Ocean. The Rowa are a part of larger Banks Islands archipelago. The islands are a natural border between Melanesia and Polynesia; they are one of the most beautiful places in the South Pacific Ocean and an integral part of a vast system of atolls and reefs.

== Geography ==
Rowa Islands consist of 15 picturesque coral cays. It is located between Ureparapara, Vanua Lava, and Mota Lava. The estimated terrain elevation above sea level is some 5 metres. A large horseshoe-shaped coral reef fringes the islands. At a low tide, the water separating the five islands located in the lagoon is so shallow that one can walk the distance among them. The vegetation on the islands is low and bushy. Of the whole group of islands, trees only grow on the main island of Rowa, making it visually taller than it actually is.

== Population ==
These low-lying islands have been uninhabited since 1939, when the local people had to leave the place after a severe tropical cyclone. They relocated permanently to neighboring islands of Ureparapara, Vanua Lava, and Mota Lava. Their traces can still be seen on the main island of Rowa—stone walls of settlements and gardens.

Formerly, the Löyöp language was natively spoken on the islands until the 1930s, when a tsunami forced them to move to the east side of Ureparapara.

== Islands ==
There are 15 islands in the archipelago. Among them are Anwet, Enwot (has the ruins of the old village), Lomeur, Moïe, Wosu, Wotansa, Rowa (the main island), Ro, Sanna, Peten, and Lavap (the smallest).

== Name ==
The name Rowa comes from an attempt of transcribing the name Roua [roua], the term for the island in the Mota language, which was used as the primary language of the Melanesian Mission. In both Löyöp and Mwotlap, it is referred to as Ayō [ajʊ] (with the locative prefix a-). All of these terms come from a Proto-Torres-Banks form *Roua [ro.u.a].
