= Siri Waterfall =

Waterfall in Vanuatu

Coordinates: 14.2774°S 167.566°E

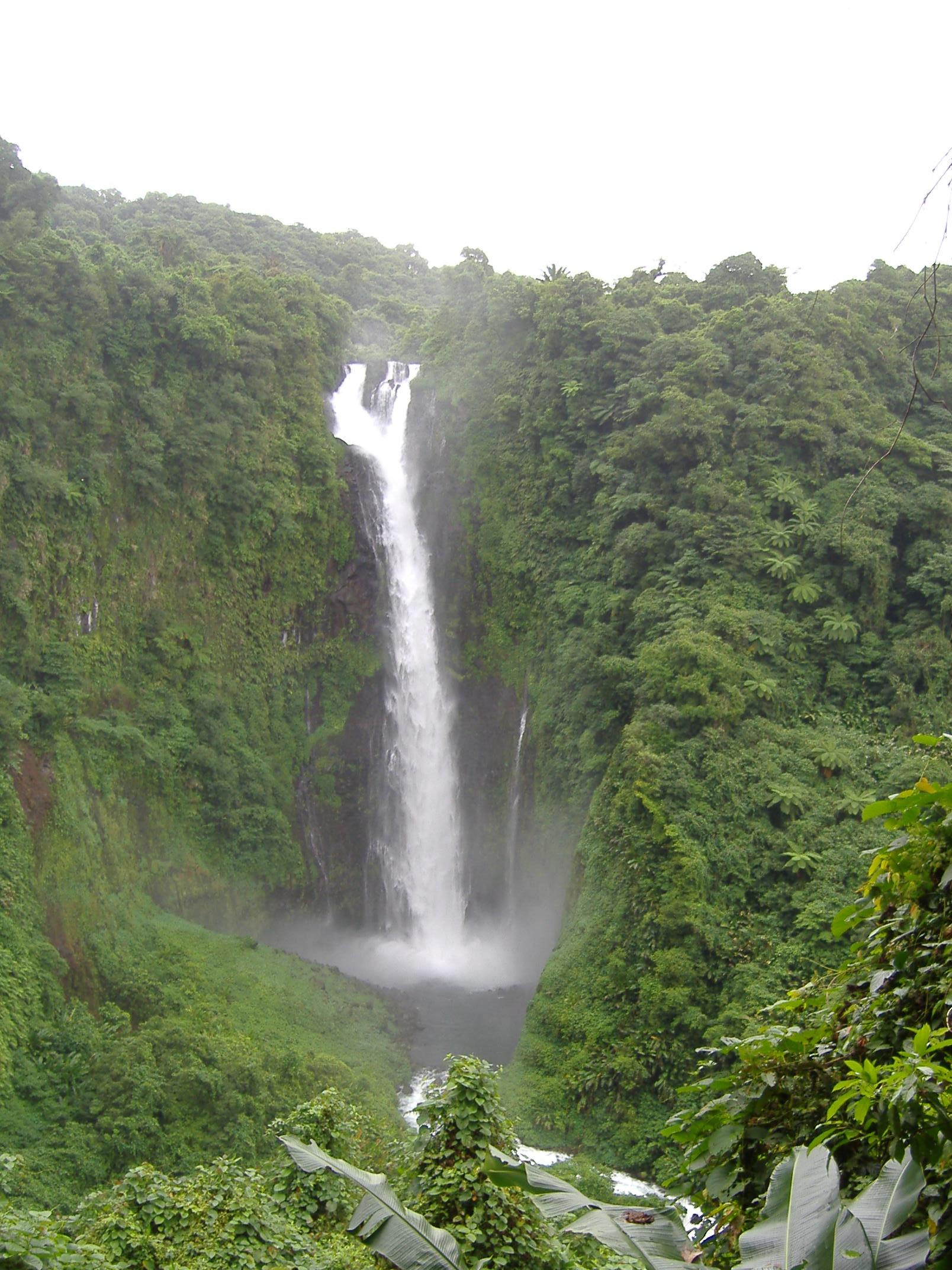
Siri Waterfall, Gaua, Vanuatu

Siri Waterfall, formerly called Santa Maria Waterfall, is a 120-metre-high (390 ft) waterfall located about 3 km inland from the eastern coast of the island of Gaua in northern Vanuatu.

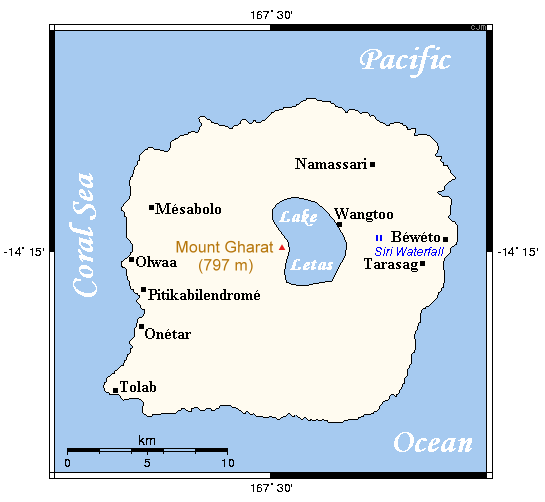
Map of Gaua Island, showing Siri Waterfall

The supply of water to the waterfall is from Lake Letas. This lake is a large freshwater lake located in the crater at the centre of the volcanic island, about 600 meters above sea level. Water flows from the lake 3 km east to the top of Siri Waterfall. After the waterfall, the water flows as a large stream, called Bē Solomul River (formerly Namang), for another 3 km before it reaches the sea. The large stream is known as "Big Water".

A rough estimate of the water flow rate (during the dry season month of August 2006) was approximately 5 cubic metres per second.

== Name ==
The name siri [siˈri] means ‘waterfall’ in the local Nume language. It is cognate with Vurës sēriv [seˈriɸ], Mwotlap na-syip [naˈsjip], Mota siriv [siriɸ], Dorig sriv [ˈsriβ], Olrat siriv [siˈriβ], Lakon hiriv [hiˈriβ], and Mwerlap siriw [siˈriw]. All of these terms can be derived from Proto-Torres–Banks *siriβi ‘waterfall’.
