= Lomeur =

Island in Vanuatu

- map of the Banks Islands
- Interactive map of Lomeur

Geography
- Location: Coral Sea
- Coordinates: 013°36′48″S 167°32′02″E

Demographics
- Population: 0

Lomeur (also Ile Moie) is a small island of the Banks Islands in the north of the Pacific island state Vanuatu.

== Geography ==
The islet is located at the eastern edge of the Rowa atoll, separated from Wosu to the north only by narrow canals. More islets join to the south.
