= Gaua Airport =

Airport in Vanuatu

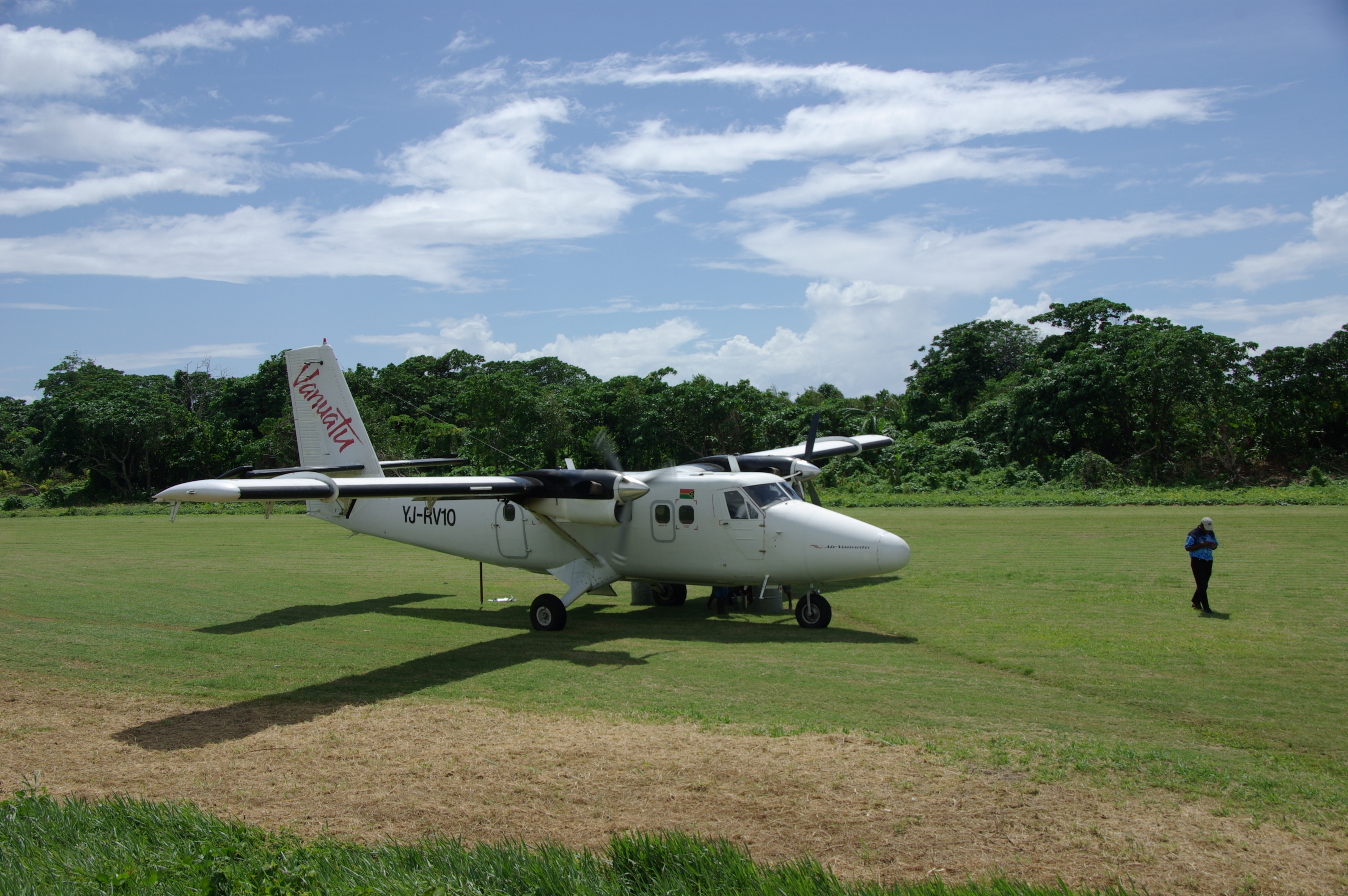
- Air Vanuatu Twin Otter at Gaua Airport (2011)
- IATA: ZGU; ICAO: NVSQ

Summary
- Airport type: Public
- Serves: Gaua, Torba, Vanuatu
- Coordinates: 14°13′05″S 167°35′14″E

Map
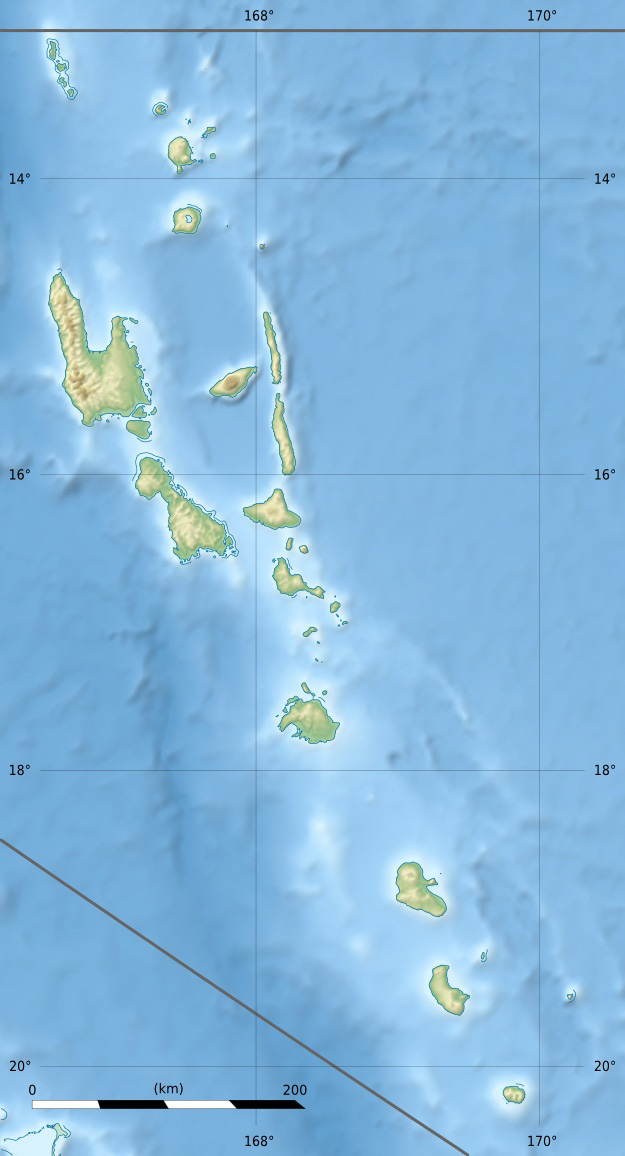
- Location of airport in Vanuatu

Gaua Airport (IATA: ZGU, ICAO: NVSQ) is an airport on the island of Gaua, one of the Banks Islands in the Torba province in Vanuatu.

== Airlines and destinations ==
Air Vanuatu connects Gaua Airport to Santo International Airport (Luganville) and Mota Lava Airport.
