= Port Patteson =

Settlement in Vanuatu

Coordinates: 13.85°S 167.55°E

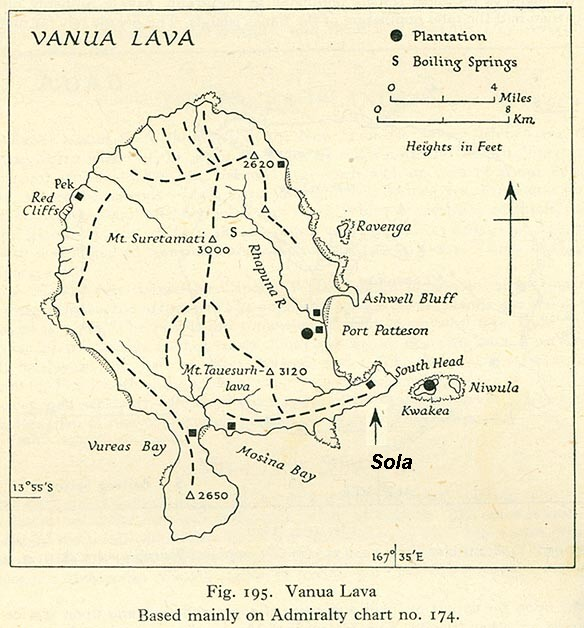
Map of Vanua Lava with Port Patteson.

Port Patteson is a harbour and settlement on the island of Vanua Lava in Vanuatu. It was named after John Patteson, the first Bishop of Melanesia.

The capital of Torba Province, Sola, is located on Port Patteson.
