= Lorevilko =

- Village
- Location in Vanuatu
- Coordinates: 15°09′59″S 167°03′58″E
- Country: Vanuatu
- Province: Sanma Province
- Island: Espiritu Santo
- Time zone: UTC+11 (VUT)

Lorevilko is a village in northeast Espiritu Santo, Sanma Province, Vanuatu. The name comes from the East Santo language and means "wild kava".

The village is in a rain shadow, making it a relatively dry place with little malaria, and little water. In 2005, the British High Commission donated several water tanks to help the villagers have enough water to drink.

== Population ==
The land is the ancestral land of the late chief Hinge. His five sons have established villages in the area, which is between Sara and Hog Harbour.

Tremendous growth has come about in the last few years because of Chief Silas Hinge, son of Hinge. Chief Silas has encouraged settlement of the land by Banks Islanders, especially from the island of Mota. The newcomers from the Banks Islands and the natives from East Santo live in harmony, working together for the good of the community.

== Religion ==
Since conversion to Christianity, most inhabitants of Lorevilko had been Roman Catholics, and there is a Catholic church in the village. Since the late 1990s, however, the Anglican Church of Melanesia has seen phenomenal growth in the village. The Anglicans have established a primary and secondary school in the village.

Lorevilko is also a major gathering place for voters in national and provincial elections, and the site for ordinations, including the ceremony for the only American to be ordained a priest in Vanuatu.

There is also a household of the Melanesian Brotherhood in the village.

People from surrounding areas often come to Lorevilko to enjoy the rural beauty of its bamboo houses, the vibrance of its custom dances, the richness of its mingled cultures.
