= Lake Letas =

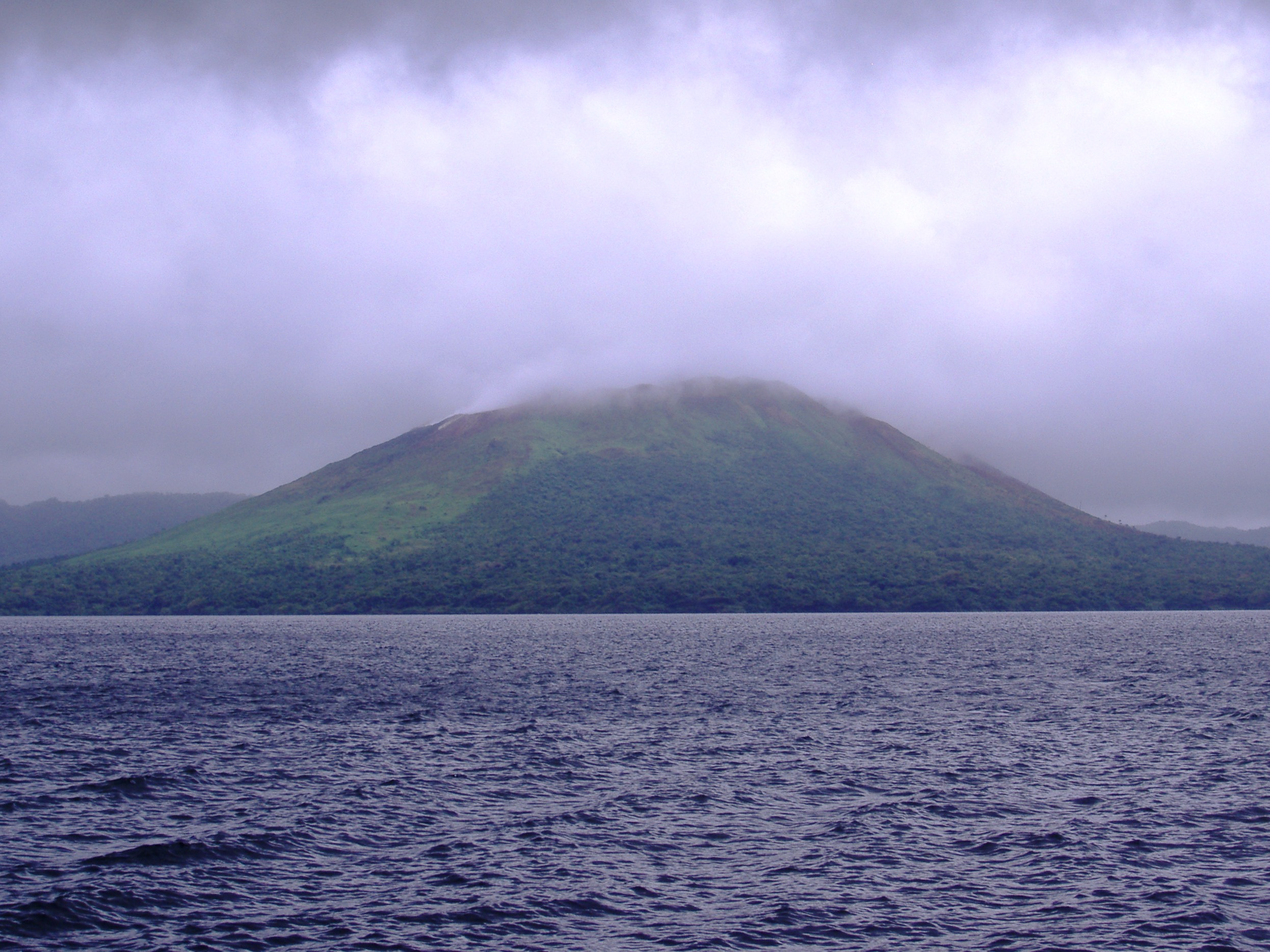
- with Mount Gharat

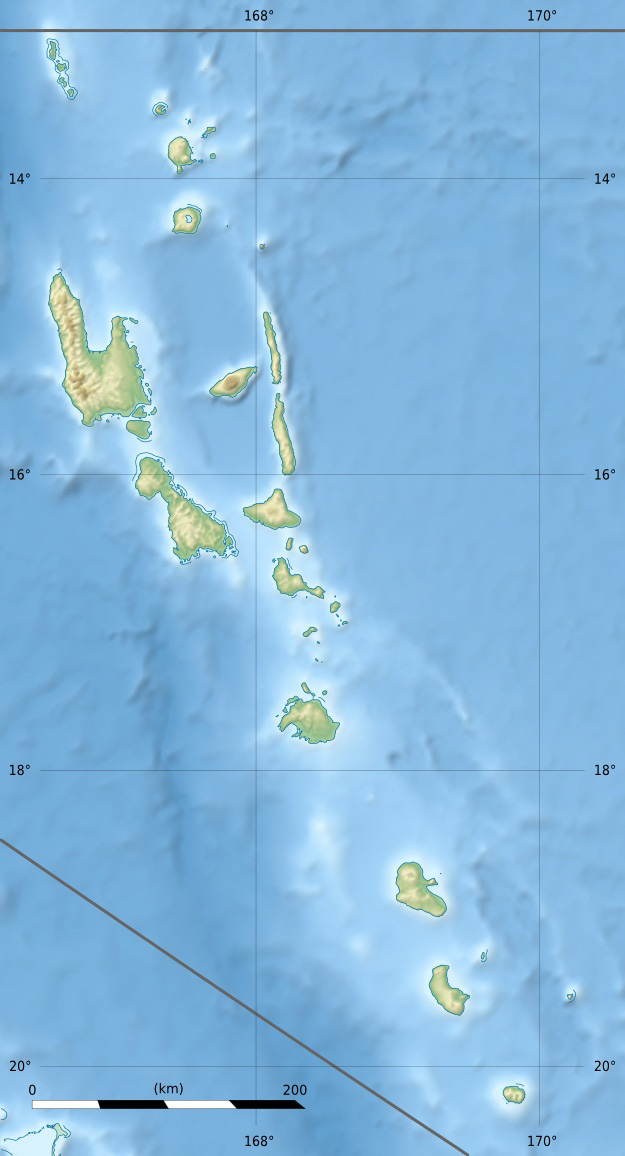
- Location within Vanuatu

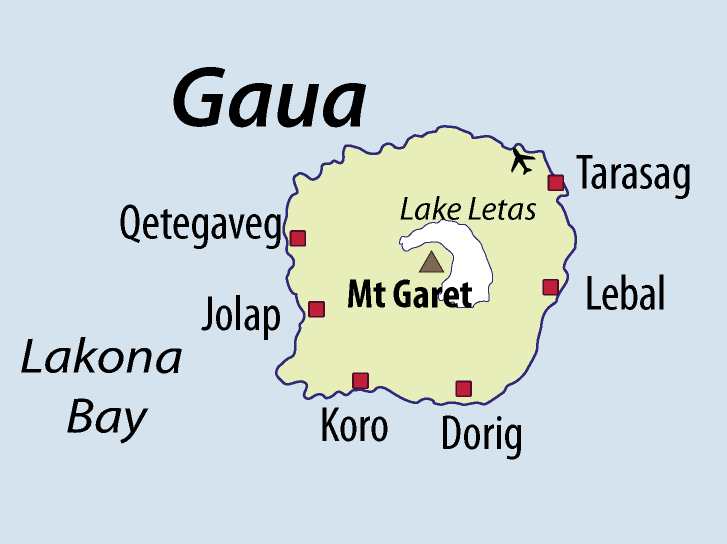
- Map of Gaua, with Lake Letas in center
- Location: Gaua
- Coordinates: 14°17′S 167°32′E
- Type: crater lake
- Primary outflows: Siri Waterfall
- Basin countries: Vanuatu
- Max. length: 6.3 km (3.9 mi)
- Max. width: 3.6 km (2.2 mi)
- Surface area: 19 km^{2} (7.3 sq mi)
- Average depth: 42 m (138 ft)
- Max. depth: 119 m (390 ft)
- Water volume: 800×10^{6} m^{3} (650,000 acre⋅ft)
- Surface elevation: 418 m (1,371 ft)

Ramsar Wetland
- Official name: Lake Letes
- Designated: 15 September 2023
- Reference no.: 2524

Lake Letas is the largest lake in Vanuatu, located in the center of the volcanic island of Gaua of the Banks Islands in northern Vanuatu. The place submitted an application to be considered an UNESCO World Heritage Site in 2004, and has been listed as a protected Ramsar site since 2023.

The volcanic lake is U-shaped, surrounding Mount Gharat on all sides except southwest. It is about 9 km long (north to south) and about 6 km wide, with an area of 19 km^{2}. It is situated in the center of the 20 km diameter island; the lake rests 418 meters above sea level and it is 119 meters deep. It is a fresh water lake with a temperature of 32 °C, where only eels and shrimps can survive. The water in the lake is not very clear, but has a greenish color. Water constantly flows out of the lake at a natural overflow located on the eastern side of the lake. The water flows about 3 km east to Siri Waterfall and then another 3 km through rivers Namang or Be Solomul before it reaches the sea.

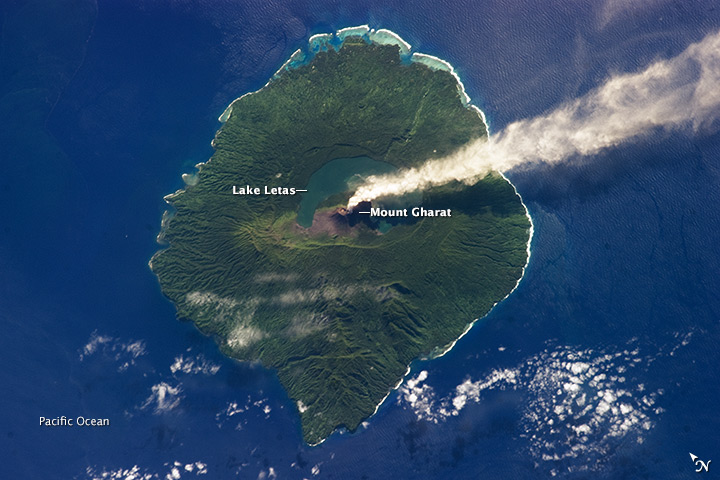
2013 Satellite view of Gaua I., with Lake Letas and Mt Gharat in its center

Local people say there is a canoe at the top of the lake which is used to cross the lake from the eastern side to get to Mount Gharat. The canoe is sometimes located on the eastern edge of the lake (near the water overflow), or sometimes on the north-eastern edge of the lake (nearest Gaua Airport).

A rough estimate of the water flow rate out of the lake (during the dry season month of August 2006) was approximately 3 cubic meters per second.

In the 1980s it was suggested that the lake could be used as a resource for power generation to supply industrial developments but later the Tourism Council of the South Pacific has suggested that the lake should be included in Vanuatu's protected area system. The Department of Physical Planning and Environment is currently considering the status of protected area to the lake.

== Name ==
The name Letas [leˈtas] comes from the Mota language, which missionaries used to name most places within the Banks Islands. Names in other local languages include Nume Le Tes [lɛˈtɛs], Dorig Bētās [ᵐbɪˈtaːs], Koro Bētäs [ᵐbɪˈtɛ͡as], Olrat Lē Tas [lɪˈtas], and Lakon Ēpitäh [ɪpiˈtæh]. All of these terms contain a reflex of Proto-Torres–Banks *tasi, meaning "sea". Additionally, the Dorig and Koro forms contain an initial component that can be reconstructed as *ᵐbei, meaning "water".
