= Sola Airport =

Sola Airport may refer to:

- Another name for Vanua Lava Airport in Vanuatu
- Stavanger Airport, Sola in Norway
