= Ra (island) =

Island in Vanuatu

Rah/Ra
Native name: Aya
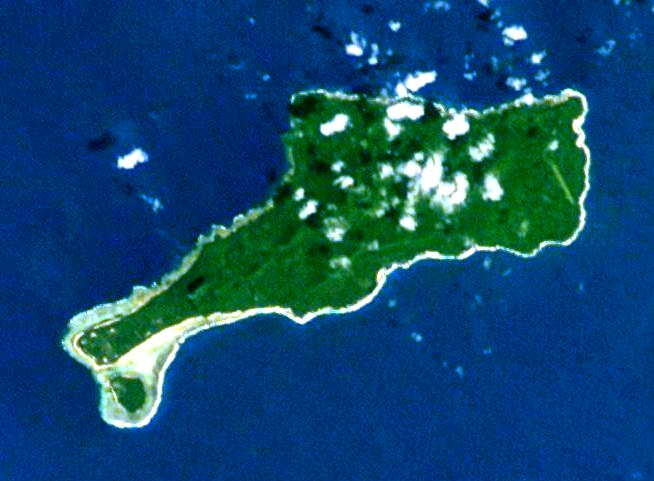
- The islet of Rah is located at the southwest point of the bigger island Mota Lava.

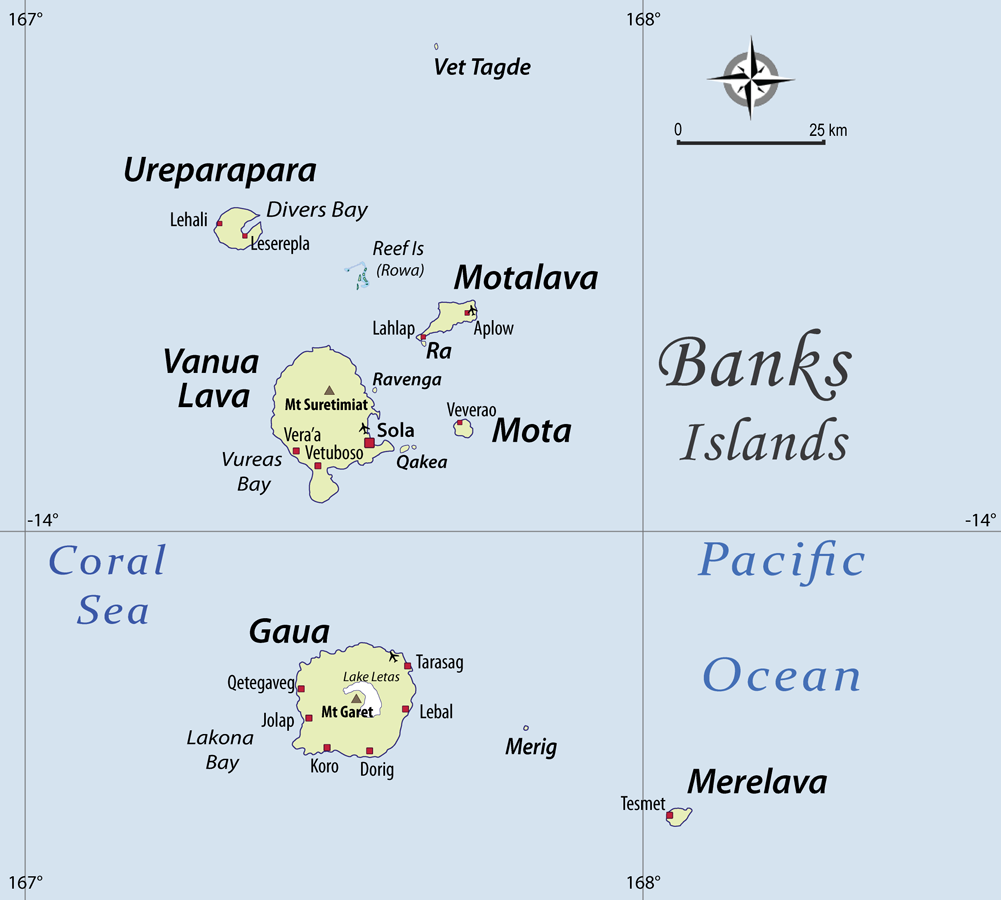

Geography
- Location: Pacific Ocean
- Coordinates: 13°42′58″S 167°37′48″E
- Archipelago: Vanuatu, Banks Islands
- Area: 0.5 km^{2} (0.19 sq mi)

Administration
- Vanuatu
- Province: Torba Province

Demographics
- Population: 189 (2009)

Rah or Ra is a small coral islet of 0.5 km^{2} (0.19 sq mi), located in the Banks group of northern Vanuatu. The same name also refers to the single village which is situated within this islet.

There is a massive rock tower on the island, which is a popular hiking spot for locals as well as tourists. It is named Tavalya in Mwotlap (meaning "the other side of Ra"), and sometimes labelled 'the Rock of Rah' in English.

The islet of Rah is situated off the larger island of Mota Lava. Access to Rah is done in two ways: at low tide, by wading across the narrow strait from the mainland;and at high tide, by outrigger canoe.

== Name ==
The islet is known in English, and Bislama, as Rah [ra] (where the letter h does not represent anything in the actual name). Rah reflects a shortened version of the form Rao [rao], which is the way the islet is called in the neighbouring language Mota. The island has also been called Ara, presumably an older variant of the current Mwotlap name.

In the islanders' own language Mwotlap, the islet is called Aya [aˈja] (with a locative prefix a-).

The name can be reconstructed, based on the Mota and Mwotlap forms, to Proto-Torres-Banks *Rao.

== Population ==
The 2009 census figures give a population of 189 inhabitants. A 2015 estimate puts the population of the island at 224 people, with 42 households.
