= Ravenga =

Island in Vanuatu

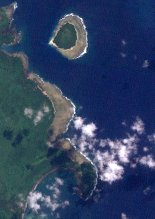
- Interactive map of Ravenga

Geography
- Location: Pacific Ocean
- Coordinates: 13°47′S 167°33′E
- Archipelago: Vanuatu

Administration
- Vanuatu
- Province: Torba Province
- Largest settlement: Sola

Ravenga is a small island in Torba Province, Vanuatu, in the Pacific Ocean. The island is also known as Ranenger.

== Geography ==
Ravenga lies 1.2 km off the eastern coast of Vanua Lava. The island has a diameter of about 800 meters, and is surrounded by white sandy beaches. On the northern, eastern, and southern sides of Ravenga, the reef extends offshore about 250 m, and then drops off into deep water.

== Name ==
The name Ravenga comes from the Mota language, which was used as the primary language of the Melanesian Mission. It is pronounced in Mota as [raβeŋa]. In Mwotlap, it is referred to as Ayven̄ [ajˈβɛŋ] (with the locative prefix a-). All of these terms come from a Proto-Torres-Banks form *raβeŋa.
