= Mota Lava Airport =

Airport in Aplow, Vanuatu

Mota Lava Airport Valua Airport
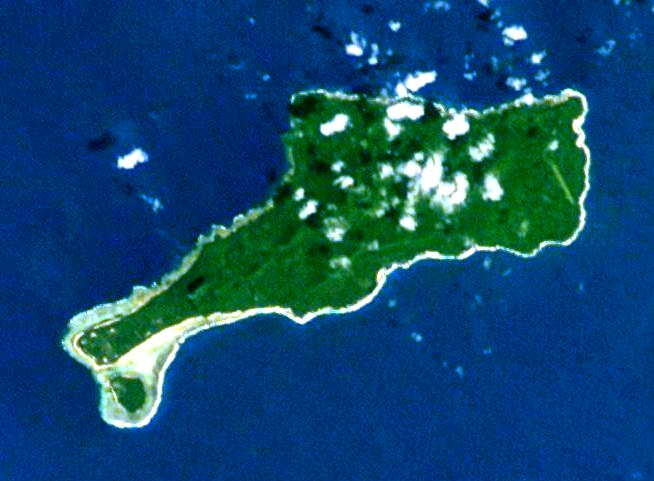
- Mota Lava island, viewed from space. The airstrip of Valua airport is visible on the eastern area.
- IATA: MTV; ICAO: NVSA

Summary
- Airport type: Public
- Serves: Mota Lava, Torba, Vanuatu
- Location: Aplow
- Elevation AMSL: 63 ft (19 m)
- Coordinates: 13°39′57″S 167°42′40″E

Map
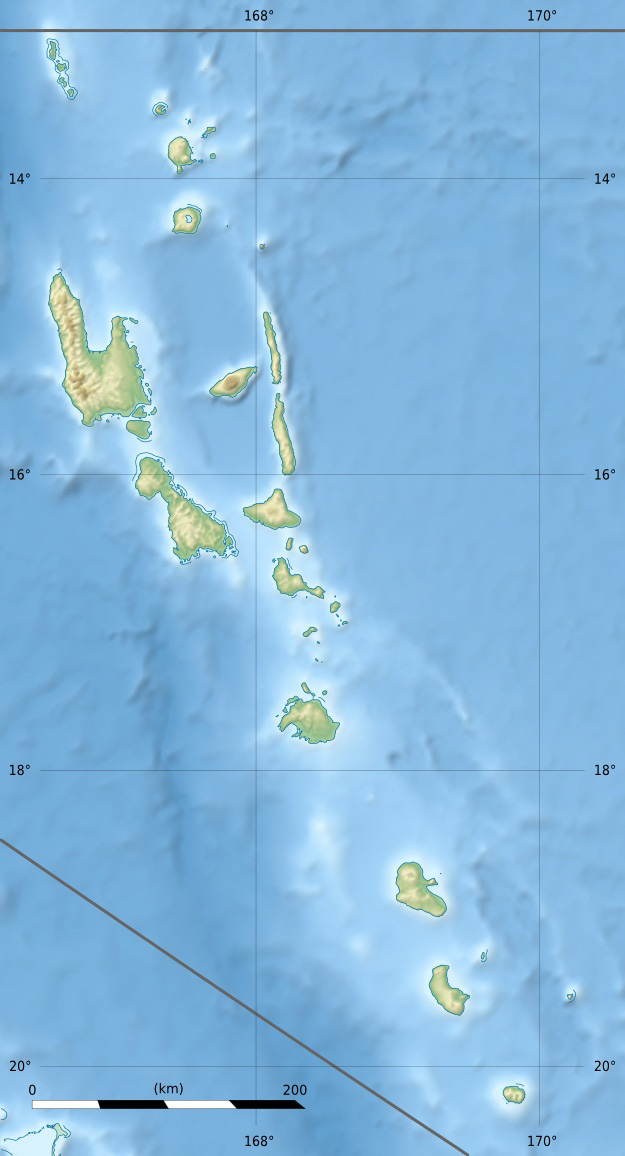
- Location of airport in Vanuatu

Runways
Direction	Length		Surface
Direction	m	ft	Surface
	900	2,953

Mota Lava Airport (IATA: MTV, ICAO: NVSA) is an airport located on the island of Mota Lava, one of the Banks Islands in the Torba province in Vanuatu. Also known as Valua Airport, it is located on the eastern end of Motalava island, near the village of Aplow (formerly known as Valuwa).

== Characteristics ==
The airport is situated at an elevation of 63 feet (19 m) above mean sea level. It has one runway, 900 metres (2,953 ft) in length.

Out of the four airports in the Torba province, Valua Airport has the length and reliability advantage. Air Vanuatu coordinates all maintenance and rehabilitation programs of the building facilities, including the runway. Identical to other island aircraft ports throughout the archipelago, safety and security fencing is still lacking.

Valua airport is 12 km from the island's main center. There may be one or two four-wheel drive vehicles available on some flights, but their availability is not guaranteed. One can also hike to the island's center by foot in just under three hours. Water sources are scarce and many are unsafe for drinking. At times there are road markets, basically non-cooked island crops up for sale, with hot meals being occasionally served. No clinic or restroom can be found near the airport boundary.

== Airlines and destinations ==
Air Vanuatu connects Mota Lava Airport to Santo International Airport (Luganville).
