= Vanua Lava Airport =

Airport in Sola, Vanuatu

- IATA: SLH; ICAO: NVSC

Summary
- Airport type: Public
- Serves: Vanua Lava, Torba, Vanuatu
- Location: Sola
- Elevation AMSL: 7 ft (2.1 m)
- Coordinates: 13°51′06″S 167°32′13″E

Map
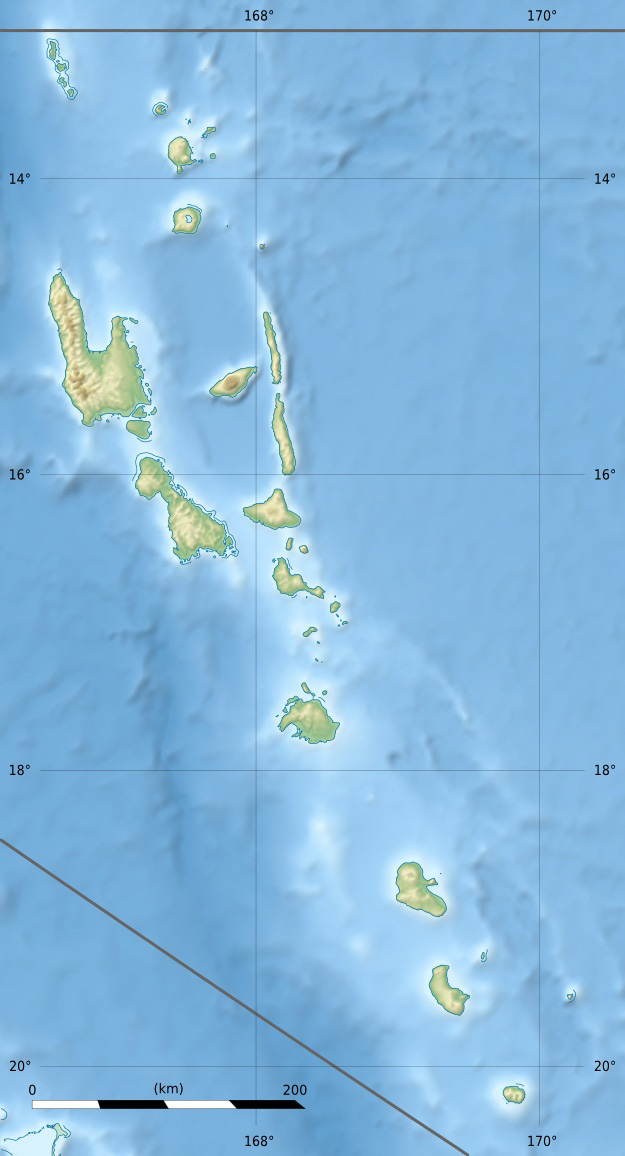
- Location of airport in Vanuatu

Runways
Direction	Length		Surface
Direction	m	ft	Surface
	700	2,297

Vanua Lava Airport (IATA: SLH, ICAO: NVSC), also known as Sola Airport, is an airport near Sola on the island of Vanua Lava, one of the Banks Islands in the Torba province in Vanuatu.

== Facilities ==
The airport resides at an elevation of 7 feet (2 m) above mean sea level. It has one runway which is 700 metres (2,297 ft) in length.

== Airlines and destinations ==
Air Vanuatu connects Vanua Lava Airport to Santo-Pekoa International Airport (Luganville).
