= Merig =

- Island
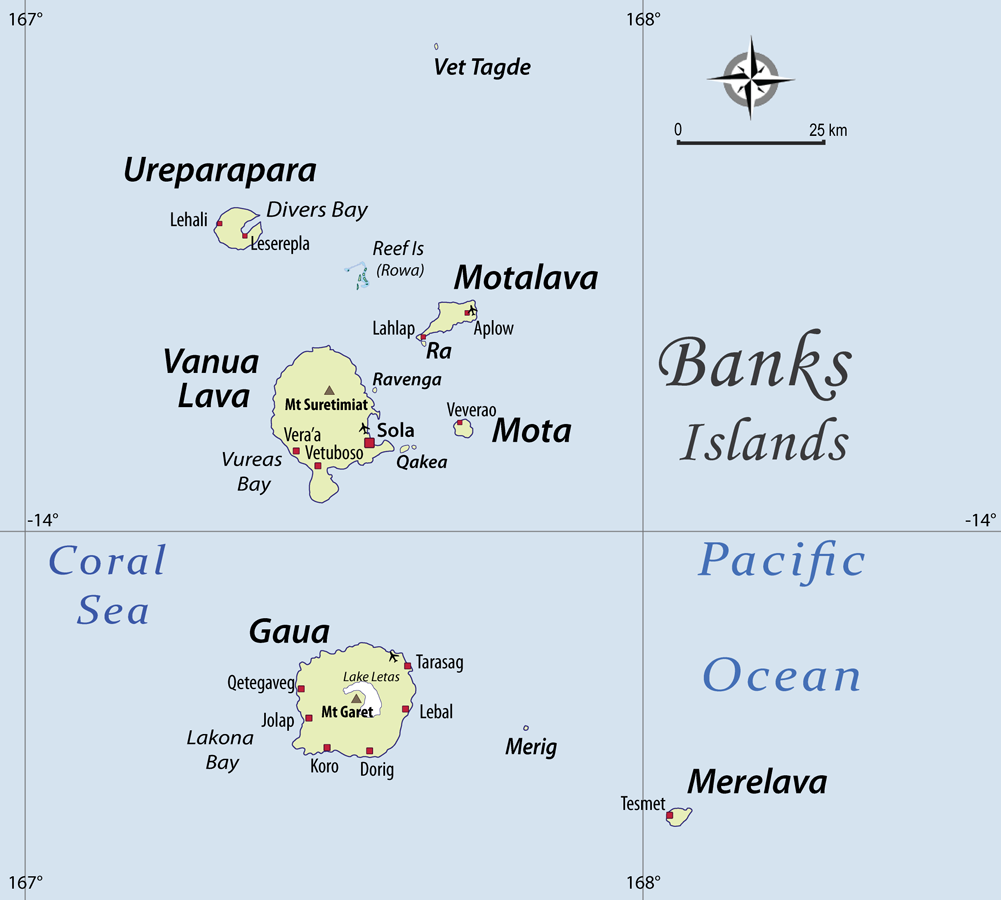
- Location of Merig in Banks Islands

- Location in Vanuatu
- Coordinates: 14°19′S 167°48′E
- Country: Vanuatu
- Province: Torba Province

Area
  - Total: 0.5 km^{2} (0.19 sq mi)

Population (2009)
  - Total: 12
  - Density: 24/km^{2} (62/sq mi)
- Time zone: UTC+11 (VUT)

Merig is a small island located 20 kilometres (12 miles) east of Gaua, in the Banks Islands of northern Vanuatu.

The island is about 800 metres (2,600 feet) wide, and has a circumference of 2.2 kilometres (1 mile).

== Name ==
The name Merig [ŋ͡mʷeriɣ] comes from the Mota language. It comes from a Proto-Torres-Banks form *mʷera riɣi "the small boy" via haplology to *mʷeriɣi. It contrasts with Merelava, from *mʷera-i laβa "the big boy". The native term in Mwerlap is N̄wërig [ŋʷɞˈriɣ], from the same etymon.

== History ==
The first recorded sighting of Merig Island by Europeans was by the Spanish expedition of Pedro Fernández de Quirós on 25 April 1606. It was then named Île Sainte Claire.

== Population ==
As of 2009, Merig was only inhabited by three households, consisting of 12 individuals. Merig was not listed in Vanuatu's 2020 census.

The inhabitants of Merig speak Mwerlap, the language of the neighbouring island Merelava.
