= Mount Gharat =

Volcano in Vanuatu

Mount Gharat (Mount Garet)
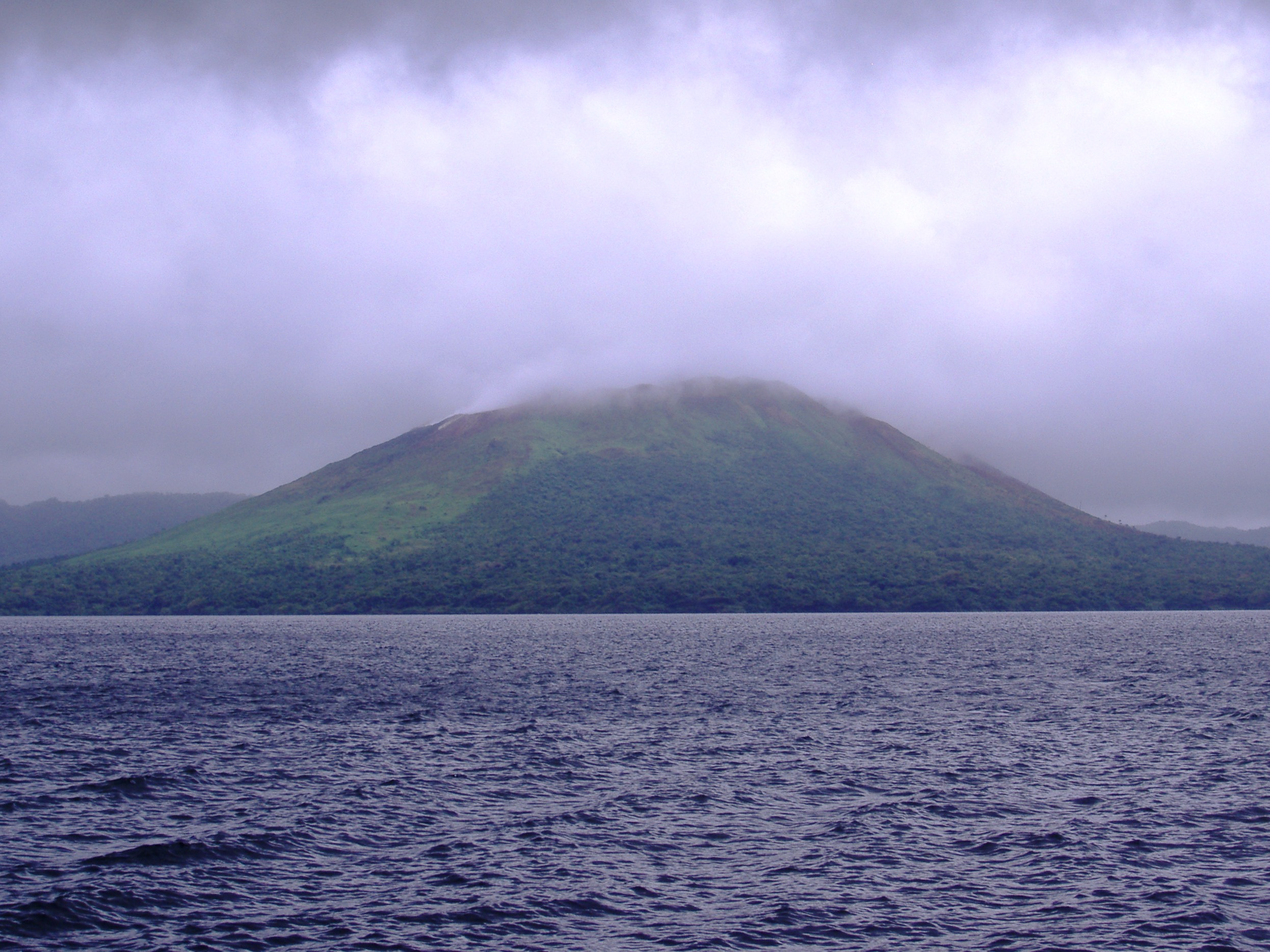
- Mount Gharat and Lake Letas

Highest point
- Elevation: 797 m (2,615 ft)
- Prominence: 797 m (2,615 ft)
- Coordinates: 14°16′S 167°30′E

Geography
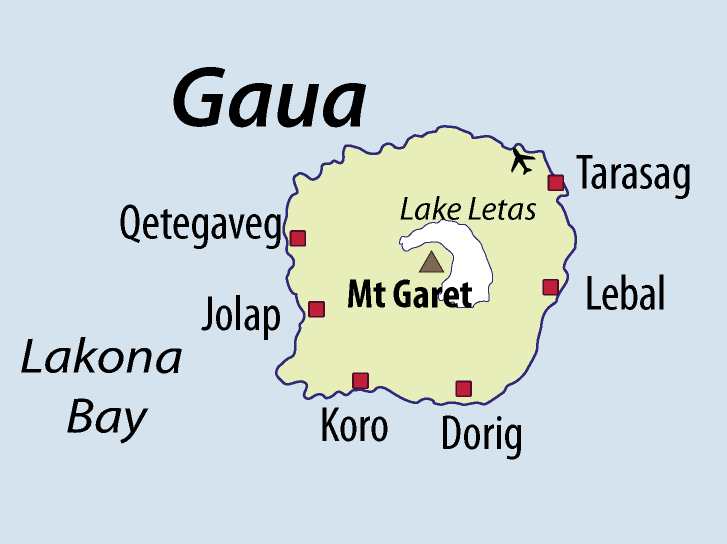
- Mt Garet, in the middle of Gaua island
- Location: Gaua, Banks Islands, Vanuatu

Geology
- Mountain type: Somma-Stratovolcano
- Last eruption: 2011

Mount Gharat or Mount Garet (797 m), a somma volcano, is the highest peak on the volcanic island of Gaua of the Banks Islands in northern Vanuatu.

== Geography ==
The peak is located at the centre of the island, is volcanically active and is surrounded by Lake Letas on all sides except the southwest.

Mount Gharat on Gaua island
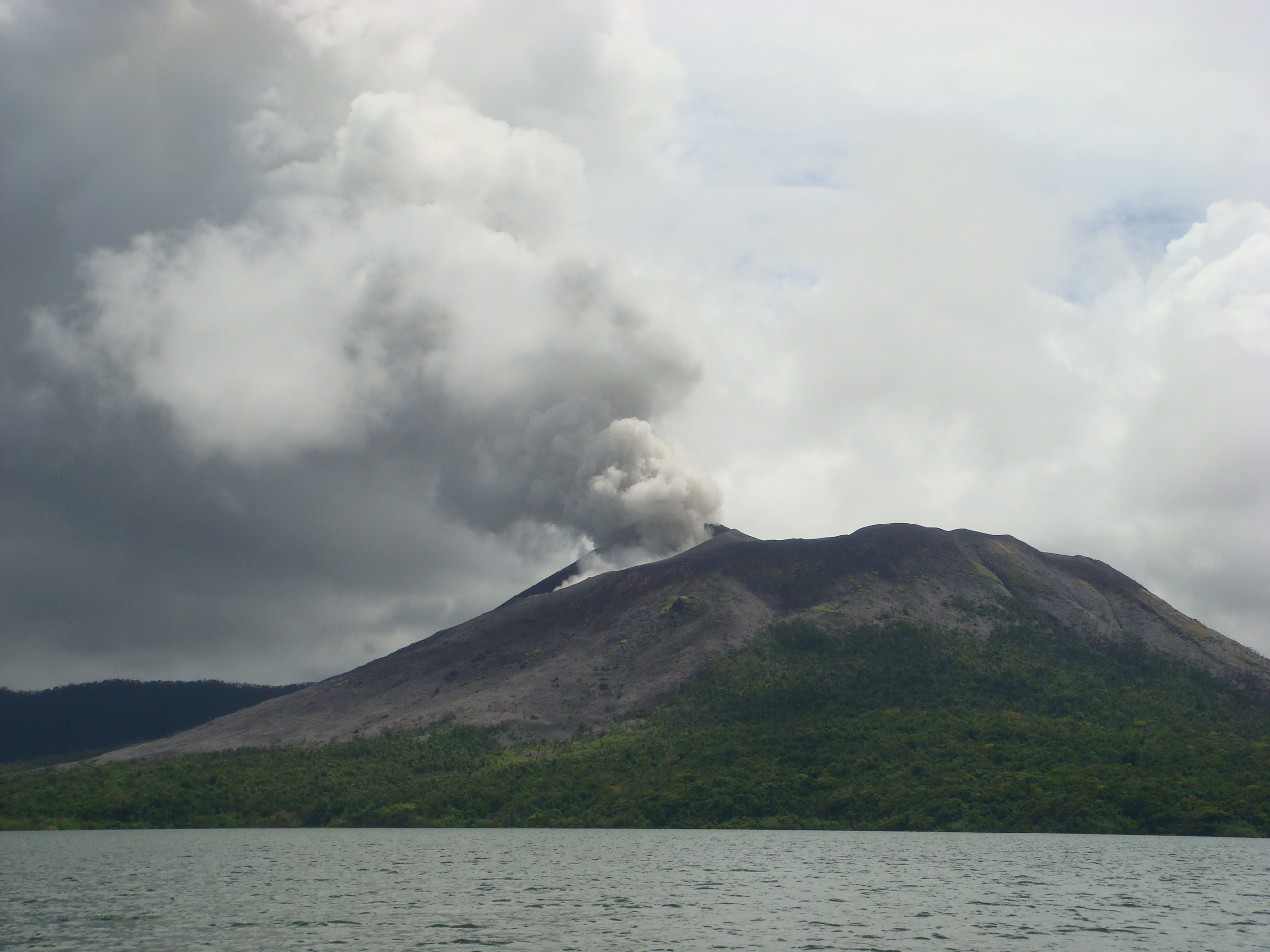
Eruption of Mt Garet in Sept 2010.

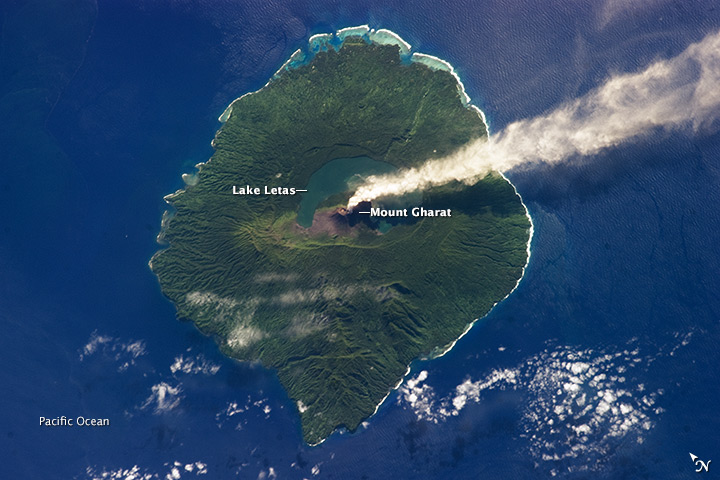
2013 satellite picture of Mt Garet during eruption

== Name ==
The volcano has slightly different names, depending on which of the local languages is being considered. It is known as Garet [ɣaˈrɛt] in Nume, Grāt [ɣraːt] in Dorig, Gerät [ɣɛˈrɛ͡at] in Koro, Gäräs [ɣæˈræs] in Lakon. The spelling Gharat found sometimes on maps is an attempt at transcribing Mota or Olrat Garat [ɣarat].

All these names come from a Proto-Torres-Banks form *ɣarati, whose literal meaning is “itching, burning” ‒ perhaps in relation to the volcano's toxic fumes.
