= Mota Lava =

Island in Vanuatu

Motalava
Native name: Mwotlap
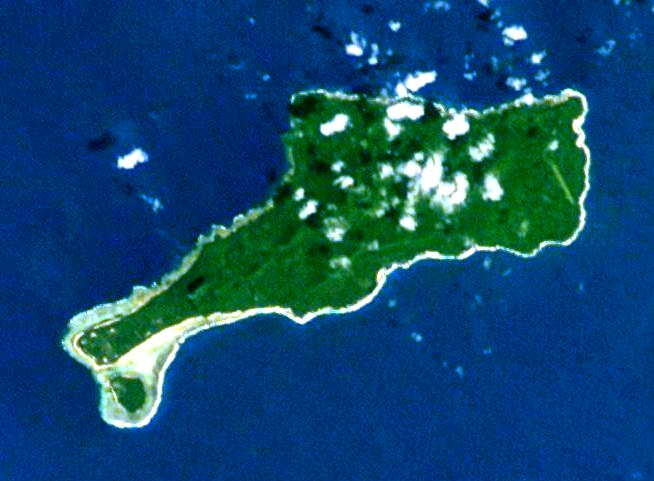
- Mota Lava, viewed from space. The islet of Ra can be seen in this image at a point southwest of Mota Lava.

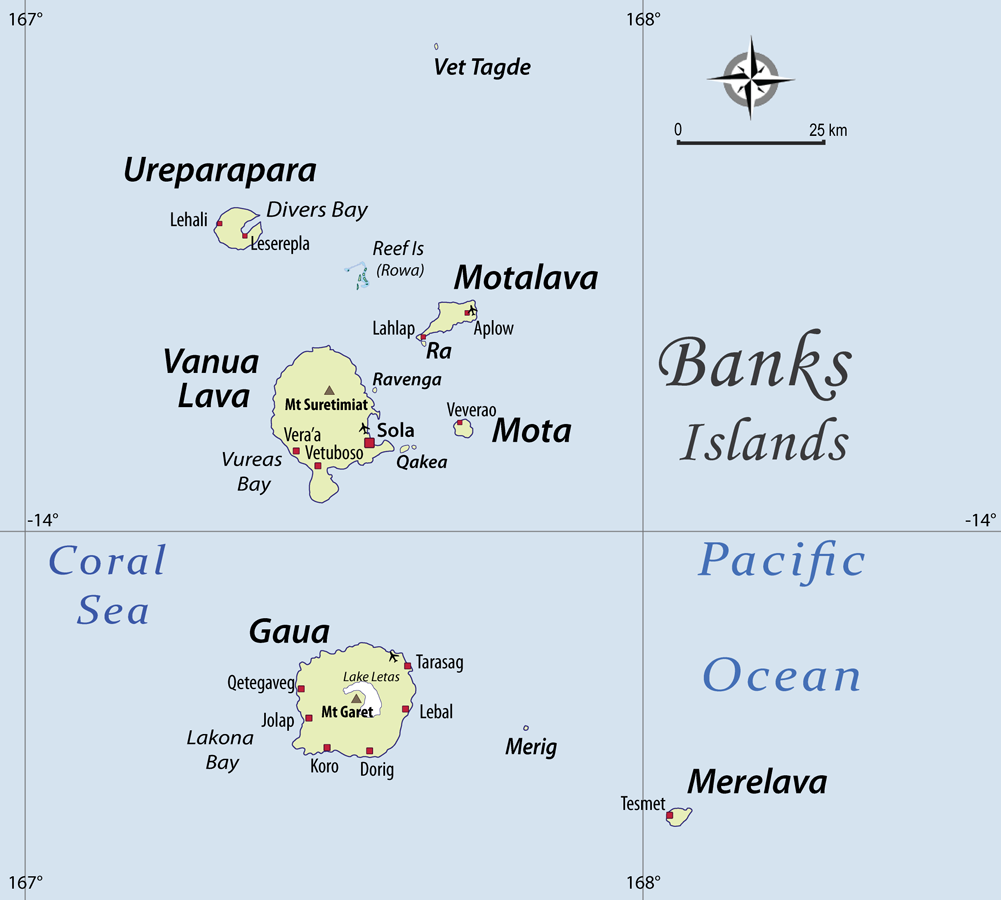

Geography
- Location: Pacific Ocean
- Coordinates: 13.7°S 167.65°E
- Archipelago: Vanuatu, Banks Islands
- Area: 24 km^{2} (9.3 sq mi)

Administration
- Vanuatu
- Province: Torba Province
- Largest settlement: Lahlap

Demographics
- Population: 1,640 (2009)
- Pop. density: 67/km^{2} (174/sq mi)

Mota Lava or Motalava is an island of the Banks group, in the north of Vanuatu. It forms a single coral system with the small island of Ra.

The 2009 census figures give a population of 1,640 inhabitants (Mota Lava + Ra), which amounts to a population density of 67 people per km^{2}.

== Geography ==
=== Geography and geology ===
With an area of 24 km^{2} (9.3 sq mi), Mota Lava is the fourth largest island in the Banks Islands, after Gaua, Vanua Lava and Ureparapara. It is the highest (411 m or 1,348 ft) of the eastern chain of islands, as well as the largest.

Ra, a small island of 50 ha (120 acres), is located 270 meters (886 ft) off the southern coast of Mota Lava. It is attached to it by high corals that one can wade through at low tide.

The climate on Mota Lava is humid tropical. The average annual rainfall exceeds 4000 mm. The island is subject to frequent earthquakes and cyclones.

The island is served by Mota Lava Airport.

=== Geology ===
Mota Lava is composed of at least five basaltic stratovolcanoes. Two of the cones, Vetman and Tuntog, are well-preserved. Vetman is a pyroclastic cone in the centre of the island with a breached summit crater. At the southwest end of the island, Tuntog is a composite cone with a 500 meters (1,640 feet) wide crater.

Geochemical analysis shows that the island's lava has a similar composition to that from nearby Mota and Ureparapara, as well as lava from the south of the country, but differs from material erupted in central Vanuatu. The latter region has been affected by the subduction of a submerged, extinct island arc complex called the D'Entrecasteaux Zone.

== Name and language ==
In early 19th-century texts and maps, Mota Lava was called Saddle Island, after the distinctive saddle-shaped profile it presents when seen from a boat offshore.

The inhabitants of Mota Lava call the island Mwotlap, locally spelled M̄otlap (pronounced [ŋ͡mʷɔtˈlap]).

The language spoken by the inhabitants of Motalava is also called Mwotlap. It is the most widely spoken language in the Banks Islands, with about 2,100 speakers. The recently extinct Volow language also used to be spoken on Mota Lava.

An early attempt to transcribe the native name, both for the island and the language, yielded a form Motlav.

The name M̄ota Lava [ŋ͡mʷota laβa] (or in simple spelling, Motalava) caught on after it started being used by 19th-century missionaries to the island. They borrowed that name from the language spoken on neighbouring Mota. Both the Mota and Mwotlap names of the island descend from a protoform *mʷota laβa in Proto-Torres-Banks, literally "large Mota". A process of vowel deletion, regular in Mwotlap, explains how *[mʷotaˈlaβa] was shortened to [ŋ͡mʷɔtˈlap].

== History ==
Like the rest of Vanuatu, Motalava was first settled around the 12th century BCE by Austronesian navigators belonging to the Lapita culture. Archaeologists have found ancient obsidian in Mota Lava, Vanua Lava and Gaua, and Lapita pottery have been found in the island.

The island was first sighted by Europeans during the Spanish expedition of Pedro Fernández de Quirós, from 25 to 29 April 1606. The island’s name was then charted as Lágrimas de San Pedro (“St. Peter's Tears”, in Spanish).

== Notes and references ==
=== References ===
- "Motlav". Global Volcanism Program. Smithsonian Institution.
- David W. Peate; Julian A. Pearce; Chris J. Hawkesworth; Howard Colley; Caroline M. H. Edwards; Kei Hirose (1997). "Geochemical Variations in Vanuatu Arc Lavas: the Role of Subducted Material and a Variable Mantle Wedge Composition". Journal of Petrology. 38 (10): 1331–1358. doi:10.1093/petrology/38.10.1331.
- Vienne, Bernard (1984). Gens de Motlav - Idéologie et pratique sociale en Mélanésie. Société des Océanistes. Paris: ORSTOM.

=== External links ===
- An introduction to the culture of Mota Lava and its surroundings – featuring photos, maps, access to linguistic documents and traditional stories (site of the linguist Alexandre François)
