= Merelava =

Island in Vanuatu

Native name: N̄wërlap Nickname: Mwerlap
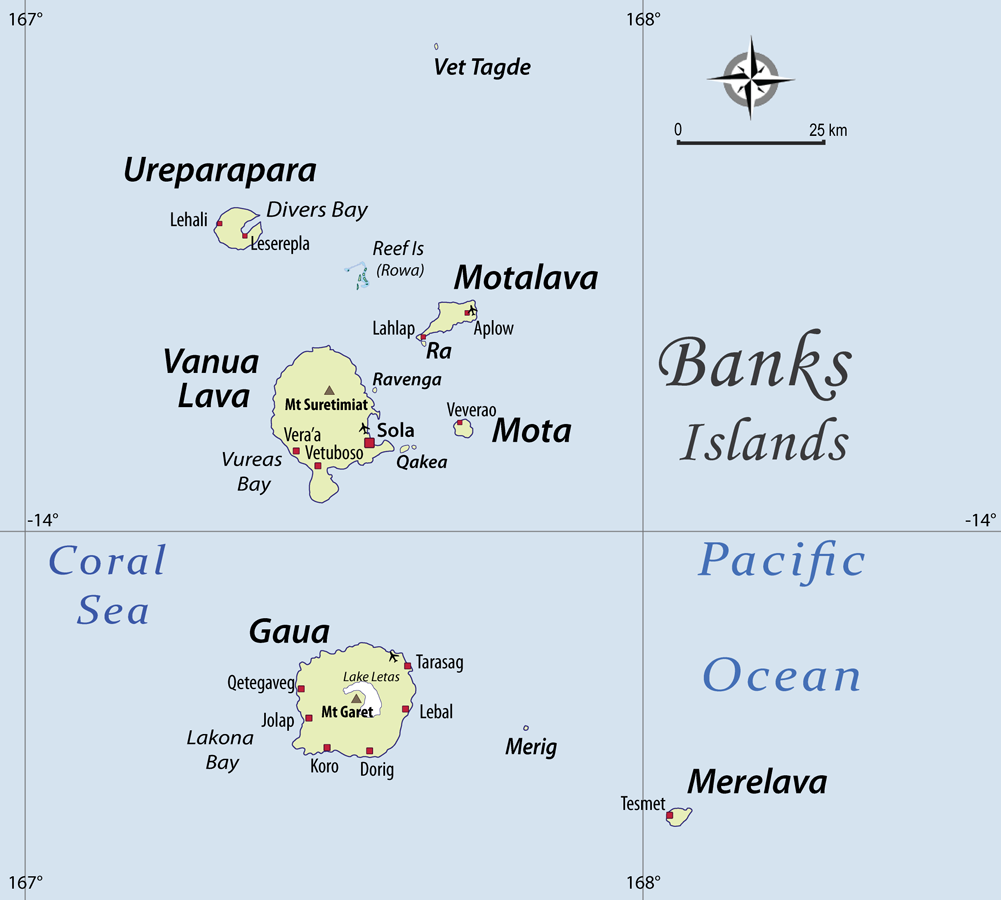
- Location of Merelava in the Banks Islands

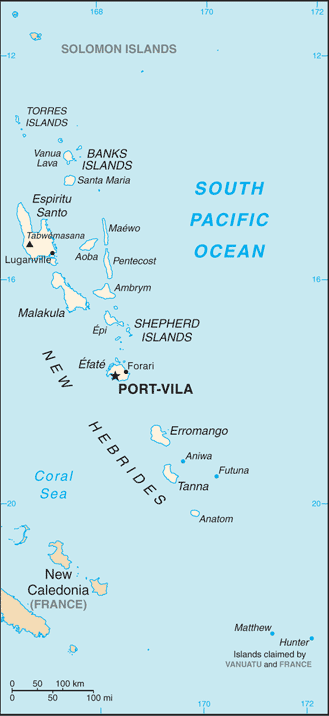

Geography
- Location: Pacific Ocean
- Coordinates: 14.45°S 168.05°E
- Archipelago: Vanuatu, Banks Islands
- Area: 18 km^{2} (6.9 sq mi)
- Highest point: Mount Teu

Administration
- Vanuatu
- Province: Torba Province

Demographics
- Population: 650 (2009)

Merelava (or Mere Lava) is an island in the Banks Islands of the Torba Province of northern Vanuatu.

== Names ==
The inhabitants of Merelava call their own island Mwerlap, more accurately N̄wërlap [ŋʷɞrˈlap] in the local language.

The name Merelava or M̄ere Lava reflects the way it is called in the neighboring Mota language ‒ phonetically [ŋ͡mʷerelaβa]. According to Codrington, the etymology of this name (in Proto-Torres-Banks) is likely to be *mʷera-i laβa > *mʷerelaβa, literally “the big boy”; it contrasts with the neighboring island M̄erig [ŋ͡mʷeriɣ], from *mʷera riɣi “the small boy”. These words refer metaphorically to the islands themselves.

Cognates in other Torres-Banks languages include Mwotlap M̄eylap [ŋ͡mʷɛjˈlap].

== Geography ==
Merelava is situated in the southeastern part of the archipelago near Mota and Merig. Merelava has also been known as Star Island. It is located about 50 kilometres (31 miles) east of Gaua.

Merelava is a nearly round volcanic island with a diameter of almost 4.5 km and an area of 18 km^{2}. It is formed by a basaltic stratovolcano, which reaches in Mount Teu, also called Star Peak, a height of 883 m above the sea level.

The main village is Tesmet on the west coast of the island. Other villages, starting clockwise at Tesmet, are Levetmise (northwest), Lekweal (north), Lewetneak (northeast), and Aot (southeast, second largest).

== History ==
Merelava was first sighted by Europeans during the Spanish expedition of Pedro Fernández de Quirós, from 25 to 29 April 1606. The island's name was then charted as San Marcos.

Merelava was reportedly seen smoking when it was first encountered by Quirós.

== Population and language ==
The island has about 650 inhabitants. They all speak an Oceanic language known as Mwerlap.

== Bibliography ==
- Codrington, Robert H.; Palmer, Jim (1896), A Dictionary of the Language of Mota, Sugarloaf Island, Banks' Islands, with a short grammar and index, London: Society for Promoting Christian Knowledge
- François, Alexandre (2005), "Unraveling the history of vowels in seventeen north Vanuatu languages" (PDF), Oceanic Linguistics, 44 (2): 443–504, doi:10.1353/ol.2005.0034, S2CID 131668754
