= Mwerlap language =

Austronesian language spoken in Vanuatu

Mwerlap
- Merelava, Merlav
- N̄wërlap
- Pronunciation: [ŋʷɞrˈlap]
- Native to: Vanuatu
- Region: Merelava, Gaua
- Native speakers: c. 1,100 (2012)
- Language family: Austronesian: Malayo-Polynesian; Oceanic; Southern Oceanic; North-Central Vanuatu; North Vanuatu; Torres-Banks; Mwerlap

Language codes
- ISO 639-3: mrm
- Glottolog: merl1237
- Mwerlap is not endangered according to the classification system of the UNESCO Atlas of the World's Languages in Danger

Mwerlap is an Oceanic language spoken in the south of the Banks Islands in Vanuatu.

Its 1,100 speakers live mostly in Merelava and Merig, but a fair proportion have also settled on the east coast of Gaua island. Besides, a number of Mwerlap speakers live in the two cities of Vanuatu, Port Vila and Luganville.

The language has been studied by Alexandre François, and more recently by Agnès Henri.

== Name ==
The language is named after Mwerlap, the native name of Merelava island.

== Phonology ==
=== Consonants ===
Mwerlap has 16 phonemic consonants.

Mwerlap consonants
		Labial	Alveolar	Velar	
		Labial	Alveolar	plain	labial
Nasal		m ⟨m⟩	n ⟨n⟩	ŋ ⟨n̄⟩	ŋʷ ⟨n̄w⟩
Plosive	voiceless	p ⟨p⟩	t ⟨t⟩	k ⟨k⟩	kʷ ⟨q⟩
Plosive	prenasal	ᵐb ⟨b⟩	ⁿd ⟨d⟩		
Fricative		v ⟨v⟩	s ⟨s⟩	ɣ ⟨g⟩	
Rhotic			r ⟨r⟩		
Approximant			l ⟨l⟩		w ⟨w⟩

- /v/ may be realized as bilabial [β] when geminated in syllable-initial position.
- /s/ may be realized as alveolo-palatal [ɕ] when geminated.

=== Vowels ===
Mwerlap has 12 phonemic vowels. These include 9 monophthongs /i ɪ ɛ ʉ ɵ ɞ ʊ ɔ a/, and 3 diphthongs /ɛa̯ ɔɞ̯ ʊɵ̯/.

Mwerlap vowels
	Front	Central	Back	Diphthongs
Close	i ⟨i⟩	ʉ ⟨u⟩	(u) ⟨u⟩	
Near-close	ɪ ⟨ē⟩	ɵ ⟨ö⟩	ʊ ⟨ō⟩	ʊɵ̯ ⟨ōö⟩
Open-mid	ɛ ⟨e⟩	ɞ ⟨ë⟩	ɔ ⟨o⟩	ɔɞ̯ ⟨oë⟩
Open		a ⟨a⟩		ɛa̯ ⟨ea⟩

/ʉ/ may also be heard as back [u] among speakers.

== Grammar ==
The system of personal pronouns in Mwerlap contrasts clusivity, and distinguishes three numbers (singular, dual, plural).

Independent pronouns in Mwerlap
		Singular	Dual	Plural
1st	inclusive	no ~ në /nɔ/~/nœ/	dōrō /ⁿdʊrʊ/	gean /ɣɛ͡an/
1st	exclusive	no ~ në /nɔ/~/nœ/	kamar /kamar/	kemem /kɛmɛm/
2nd		neak /nɛ͡ak/	kamrō /kamrʊ/	kemi /kɛmi/
3rd		(ki)sean /(ki)sɛ͡an/	karar /karar/	kear /kɛ͡ar/

Spatial reference in Mwerlap is based on a system of geocentric (absolute) directionals. That system is partly typical of Oceanic languages, and yet innovative.

== Bibliography ==
- François, Alexandre (2005). "Unraveling the history of the vowels of seventeen northern Vanuatu languages" (PDF). Oceanic Linguistics. 44 (2): 443–504. doi:10.1353/ol.2005.0034. S2CID 131668754.
- —— (2011). "Social ecology and language history in the northern Vanuatu linkage: A tale of divergence and convergence" (PDF). Journal of Historical Linguistics. 1 (2): 175–246. doi:10.1075/jhl.1.2.03fra. hdl:1885/29283.
- —— (2012). "The dynamics of linguistic diversity: Egalitarian multilingualism and power imbalance among northern Vanuatu languages" (PDF). International Journal of the Sociology of Language. 2012 (214): 85–110. doi:10.1515/ijsl-2012-0022. S2CID 145208588.
- —— (2015). "The ins and outs of up and down: Disentangling the nine geocentric space systems of Torres and Banks languages" (PDF). In Alexandre François; Sébastien Lacrampe; Michael Franjieh; Stefan Schnell (eds.). The languages of Vanuatu: Unity and diversity. Studies in the Languages of Island Melanesia. Canberra: Asia-Pacific Linguistics. pp. 137–195. hdl:1885/14819. ISBN 978-1-922185-23-5.
- —— (2016). "The historical morphology of personal pronouns in northern Vanuatu" (PDF). In Pozdniakov, Konstantin (ed.). Comparatisme et reconstruction : tendances actuelles. Faits de Langues. Vol. 47. Bern: Peter Lang. pp. 25–60.
- Henri, Agnès (2023). "Éléments de description du mwerlap (langue du Nord-Vanuatu)". Lalies. 41: 157–221. doi:10.4000/1232y.
