= Mota (island) =

Island in Vanuatu

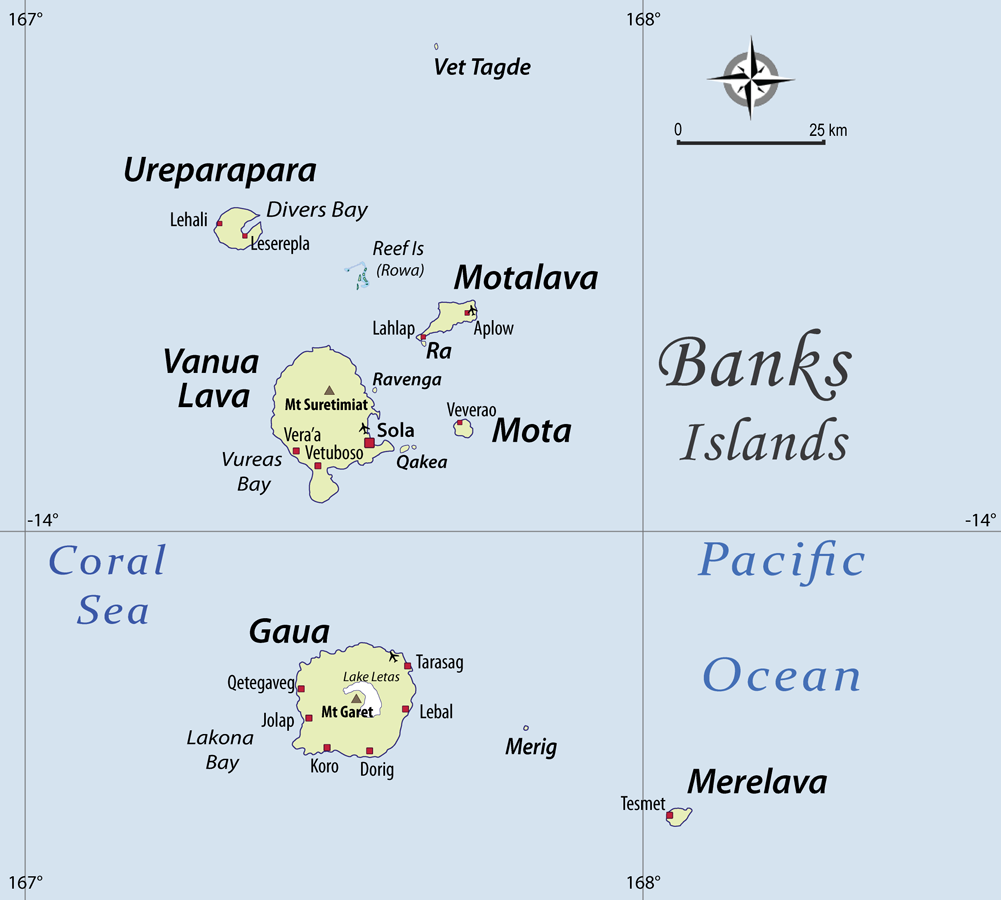
- Mota in the Banks Islands

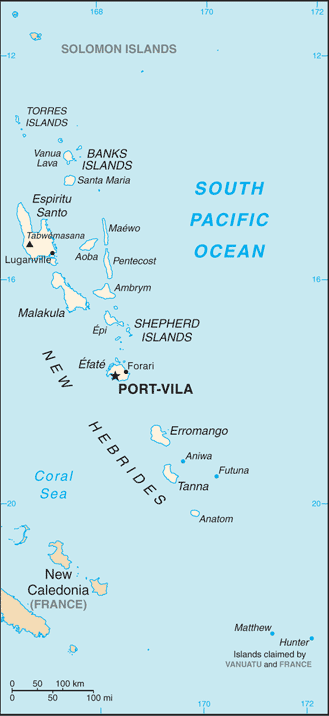

Geography
- Coordinates: 13°51′S 167°42′E
- Archipelago: Banks Islands
- Area: 9.5 km^{2} (3.7 sq mi)
- Highest elevation: 411 m (1348 ft)

Administration
- Vanuatu
- Province: Torba

Demographics
- Population: 683 (2009)
- Pop. density: 71.89/km^{2} (186.19/sq mi)

Mota (formerly Sugarloaf Island) is an island in the Banks group of northern Vanuatu. Its population – today about 700 people – speak the Mota language, which Christian missionaries of the Anglican Church used as a lingua franca in parts of Melanesia.

== Name ==
The name Mota is an adaptation of the local name M̄ota [ŋ͡mʷota]. Cognates in other Torres-Banks languages include Mwotlap Am̄ot [aˈŋ͡mʷɔt], Vera'a M̄ō'o [ŋ͡mʷʊʔɔ], and Vurës M̄ot [ŋ͡mʷɔt]. They are all derived from Proto-Torres-Banks *mʷota, referring to the island. The form is possibly cognate with Proto-Polynesian *motu "island", from Proto-Oceanic *motus "broken off, detached".

The same root is found in Mota Lava, the name of an island north of Mota (literally, "big Mota").

== Geography ==
Mota is located 18 km (11 mi) south of Mota Lava and 12 km (7.5 mi) east of Vanua Lava, the second-largest island in the Banks archipelago. The slightly oval island has a length of 5 km (3.1 mi) and has an area of 9.5 km^{2} (3.7 sq mi).

Mota is formed by an extinct, basaltic volcano, which reaches an altitude of 411 m (1,348 ft) above sea level in Mount Tawe. The island is surrounded by a fringing reef, and its steep coast makes it difficult to land on from boats.

The climate on the island is humid tropical. The average annual rainfall exceeds 3,500 mm (140 in). Mota is prone to frequent earthquakes and cyclones.

== History ==
Mota was discovered by the Portuguese navigator Pedro Fernández de Quirós who served for the Spanish expedition on 25 April 1606 and named it Nuestra Señora de la Luz (Our Lady of Light).

The island is famous because its language was used by the first missionaries in Melanesia. For the better part of a century from 1849, most teaching in classrooms and schools of all kinds, and most prayers and hymns from Isabel in the Solomons all the way through Pentecost in Vanuatu were done in the language of this small island. Some Mota words are still known throughout the Melanesian archipelago, e.g. tasiu (brother, taken here in the religious sense of "member of a brotherhood" i.e. the Melanesian Brotherhood)

The Anglican missionary, anthropologist and later Fellow of Wadham College, R. H. Codrington, lived on Mota and mastered its language. John Coleridge Patteson was also based there in the village of Veverao. The first Melanesian priest, Father George Sarawia, was from Mota, and the first Christian baptisms and Eucharist and Confirmations were there. Mota is generally held to be the first Melanesian island to have become Christian, though missionary work began a year later than on Aneityum.

== Population ==
683 people live on Mota in coastal villages around the island. The names of the villages are Liwotqei, Lotawan, Mariu, Tasmate, Garamal, Tuqetap, and Veverao. The population speaks the Mota language.

All Mota people are Christians, Anglicans affiliated with the Church of the Province of Melanesia. The primary days of celebration are the saints' days observed by the church in each village on the island. Nonetheless, kastom, which refers to Melanesian traditions, continues to hold significant importance for the islanders.

Presently, the island is ruled by a council of chiefs elected from each village. There is a school, Pasaleli Primary School, formally named Panel School. There is a dispensary where a nurse lives, access to teleradio and a public phone on the island. There are also small settlements of Mota people in Santo, especially at Lorevilko and Turtle Bay, and in Port Vila.
