= Gaua =

Island in Vanuatu

Santa Maria
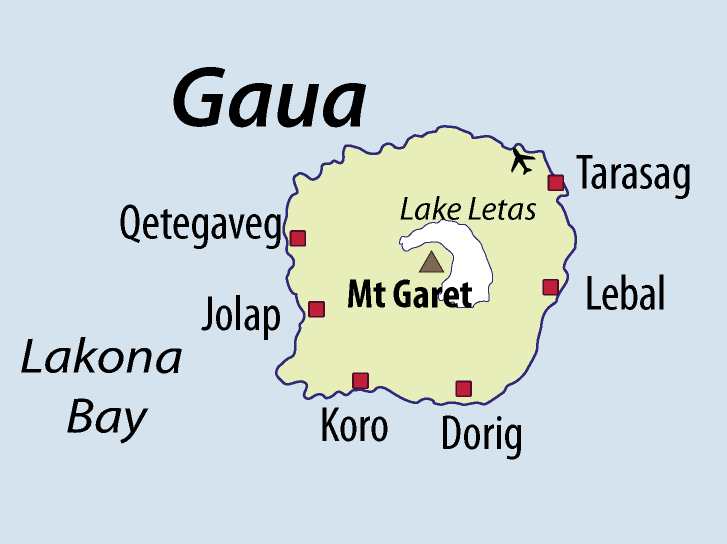
- Map of Gaua

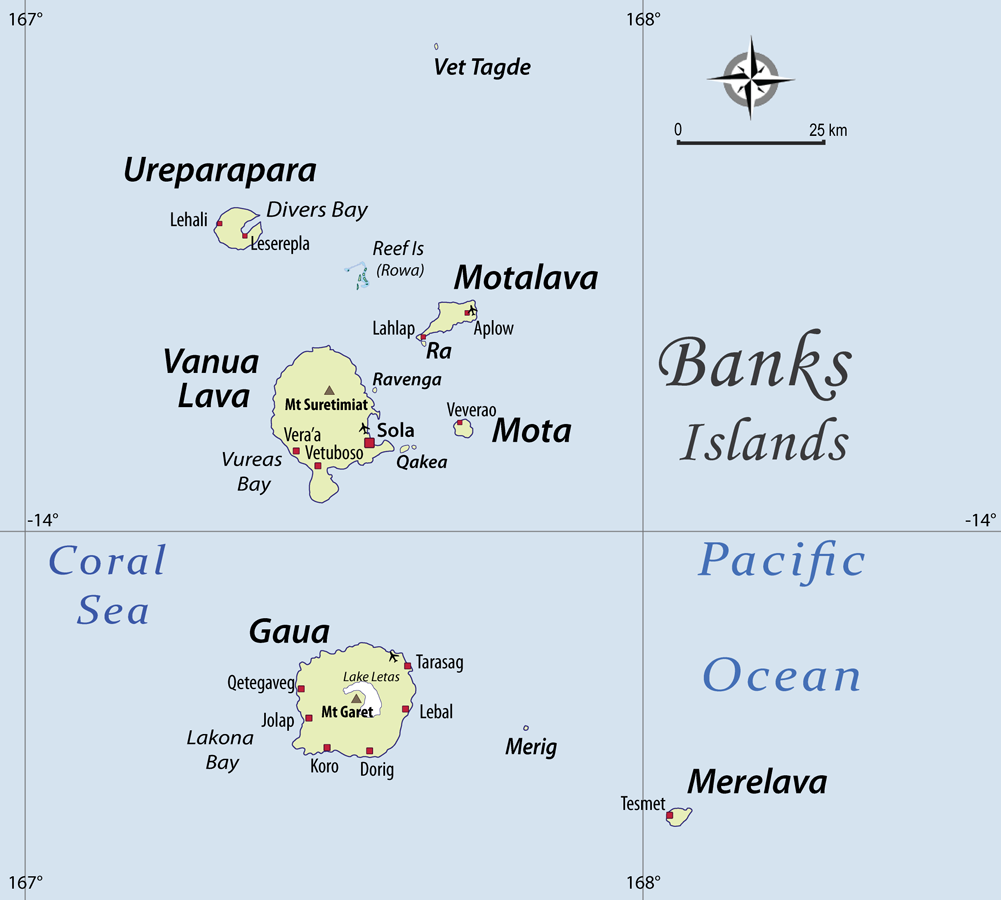

Geography
- Location: Pacific Ocean
- Coordinates: 14°15′54″S 167°31′12″E
- Archipelago: Vanuatu, Banks Islands
- Area: 330 km^{2} (130 sq mi)
- Highest elevation: 767 m (2516 ft)
- Highest point: Mount Gharat

Administration
- Vanuatu
- Province: Torba Province
- Largest settlement: Jolap

Demographics
- Population: 2,491 (2009)
- Pop. density: 7.5/km^{2} (19.4/sq mi)

Gaua [gawa] (formerly known as Santa Maria Island) is the largest and second most populous of the Banks Islands in Torba Province in northern Vanuatu. It covers 342 km^{2}.

== Geography ==
Location of the Torres and Banks Islands, in the north of Vanuatu. Gaua is the largest island, in the south of that area.

Gaua is subject to frequent earthquakes and cyclones. The climate is humid tropical; the average annual rainfall exceeds 3500 mm. It has rugged terrain, reaching up to Mount Gharat (797 m), the peak of the active stratovolcano which lies at the center of the island. Its most recent eruption was in 2013. The volcano has a 6 × 9 km caldera, within which lies a crater lake, known as Lake Letas, which is the largest lake in Vanuatu. To the east of the lake is Siri Waterfall (120 m drop).

== Natural history ==
=== Geology ===
Gaua's geology is fairly typical of an immature volcanic island arc. The oldest part of the island is the southwestern corner, which consists largely of primitive basalts and ankaramites. Most of the island is covered by the Santa Maria Pyroclastic Series, a mafic ignimbrite unit that was produced by the eruption that formed the caldera. Gaua is rare in hosting a mafic ignimbrite, as most similarly explosive eruptions are more silicic; other examples include Masaya in Nicaragua, and on Ambrym, and Tanna, also in Vanuatu. The eruption of the SMPS was also associated with the activation of ring faults, and the production of parasitic volcanic cones around the upper slopes of the volcano.

=== Wildlife ===
The upper slopes of the island have been recognised as an Important Bird Area (IBA) by BirdLife International, because they support populations of Vanuatu megapodes, Vanuatu imperial pigeons, Tanna fruit doves, red-bellied fruit doves, palm lorikeets, cardinal myzomelas, fan-tailed gerygones, long-tailed trillers, streaked fantails, Melanesian flycatchers, southern shrikebills, Vanuatu white-eyes, and red-headed parrotfinches. Other animals found there include long-tailed fruit bats, Vanuatu flying foxes, and coconut crabs.

== Population and languages ==
In 2009, the island had a population of 2,491, and an annual growth rate of 2.0 percent. The inhabitants are scattered among various coastal villages on the western, southern and northeastern sides of the island. The eastern side has a few hamlets with an immigrant community, the members of which have come from the two smaller islands Merig and Merelava, that lie southeast of Gaua. The largest village on Gaua is Jolap [ʧʊlap], on the west coast.

In addition to Mwerlap (the language of the immigrant population), there are five languages traditionally spoken on Gaua: Lakon (also called Vuré), Olrat, Koro, Dorig, and Nume.

== Economy ==
The livelihood of the people of Gaua is based on the agricultural economy that is traditional throughout of Melanesia: a combination of fishing and horticulture. Their principal exports are copra and cacao.

The island is served by Gaua Airport, which is located in the northeast corner of the island.

== Names ==
The modern name Gaua is pronounced [gawa] in Bislama, the lingua franca of Vanuatu, and in French or English.

In the local Banks languages, the island was traditionally known not by one name, but two. One name reconstructs in Proto-Torres–Banks as a form *ɣaua [ɣaˈua], the other one as *laᵑgona. These respectively referred to the northeast half of the island, and its southwestern half (where one finds Lakona Bay, and also where the Lakon language is spoken).

Thus the Mota language, which missionaries used when naming most places in the Banks Islands, has the forms Gaua [ɣaua] and Lakona [lakona]; Olrat and Lakon have Gaō [ɣaˈʊ] and Lakon [laˈkɔn]; and the immigrant language Mwerlap has Gō [ɣʊ] and Lakon [laˈkɔn]. Other Torres-Banks languages that have reflexes of the two etyma include Mwotlap Agō [aˈɣʊ] and Alkon [alˈkon]; and Vurës Gō [ɣo] and Lokon [lɔˈkɔn].

Some modern languages have generalized one of these two etyma to refer to the whole island. Thus it is called Gog [ɣɔɣ] in Nume, Gō [ɣʊ] in Koro (both < *ɣaua), and Lkon [lkɔn] in Dorig (< *laᵑgona). Other Torres-Banks languages that have only one reflex of the two etyma include Hiw and Lo-Toga Gawe [ˈɣawə] (< *ɣaua), Vera'a Lōkōno [lʊkʊnɔ] (< *laᵑgona) and Mwesen Gō [ɣʊ] (< *ɣaua).

== History ==
Gaua was first sighted by Europeans during the Spanish expedition of Pedro Fernández de Quirós, from 25 to 29 April 1606. The island’s name was then charted as Santa María.

== Gallery ==
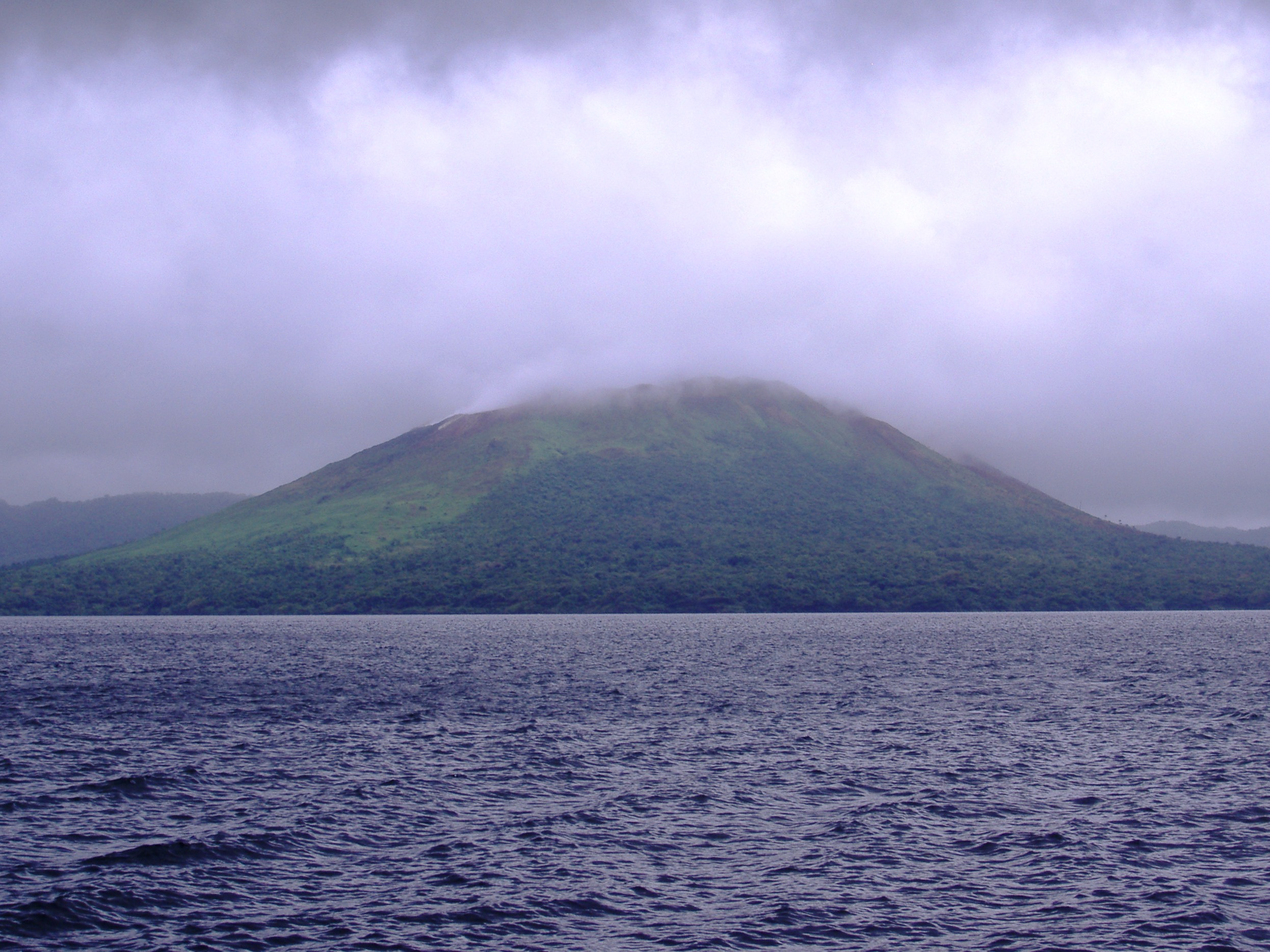
Mount Gharat and Lake Letas

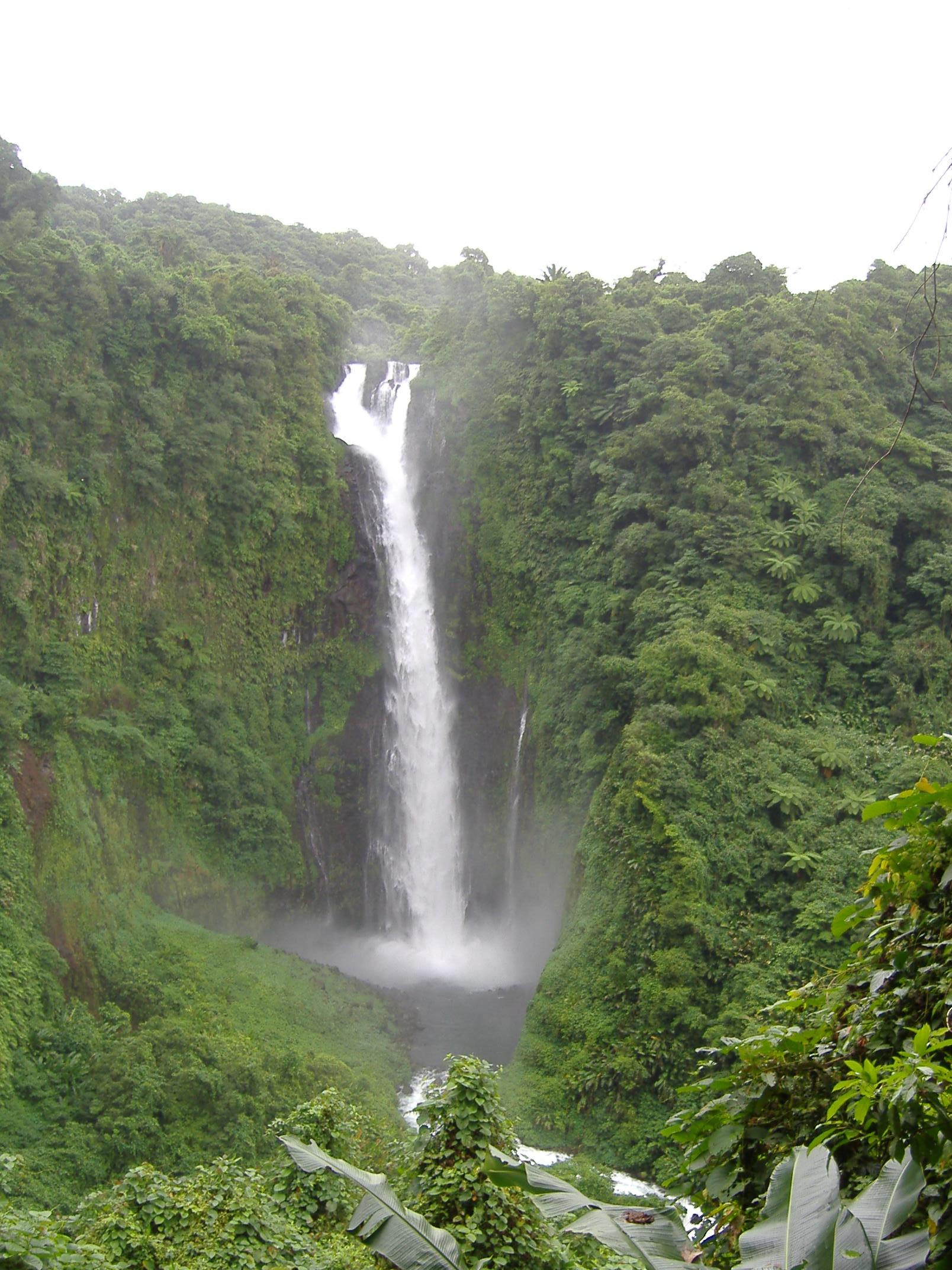
Siri Waterfall

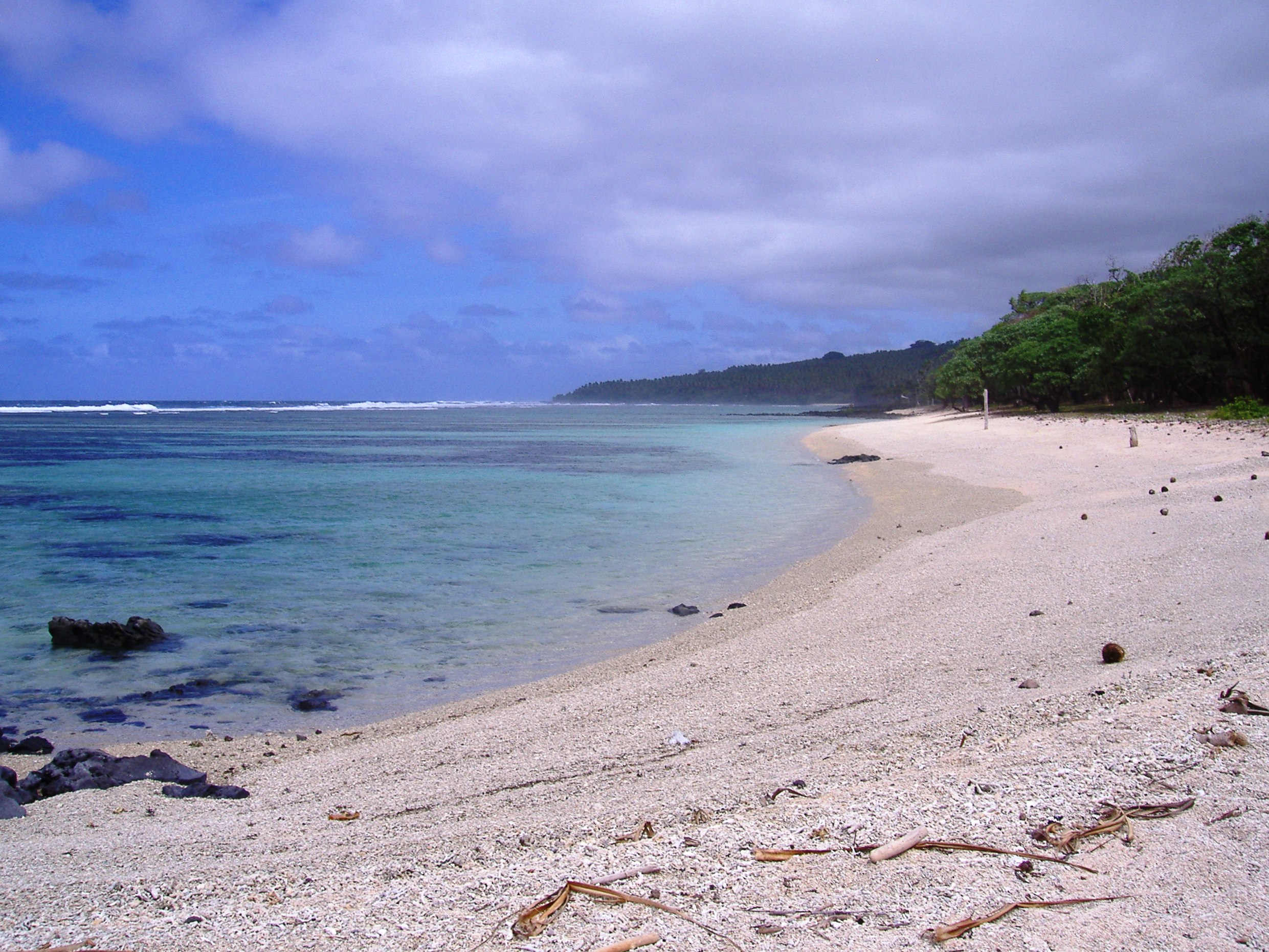
Baravit Beach (east coast)

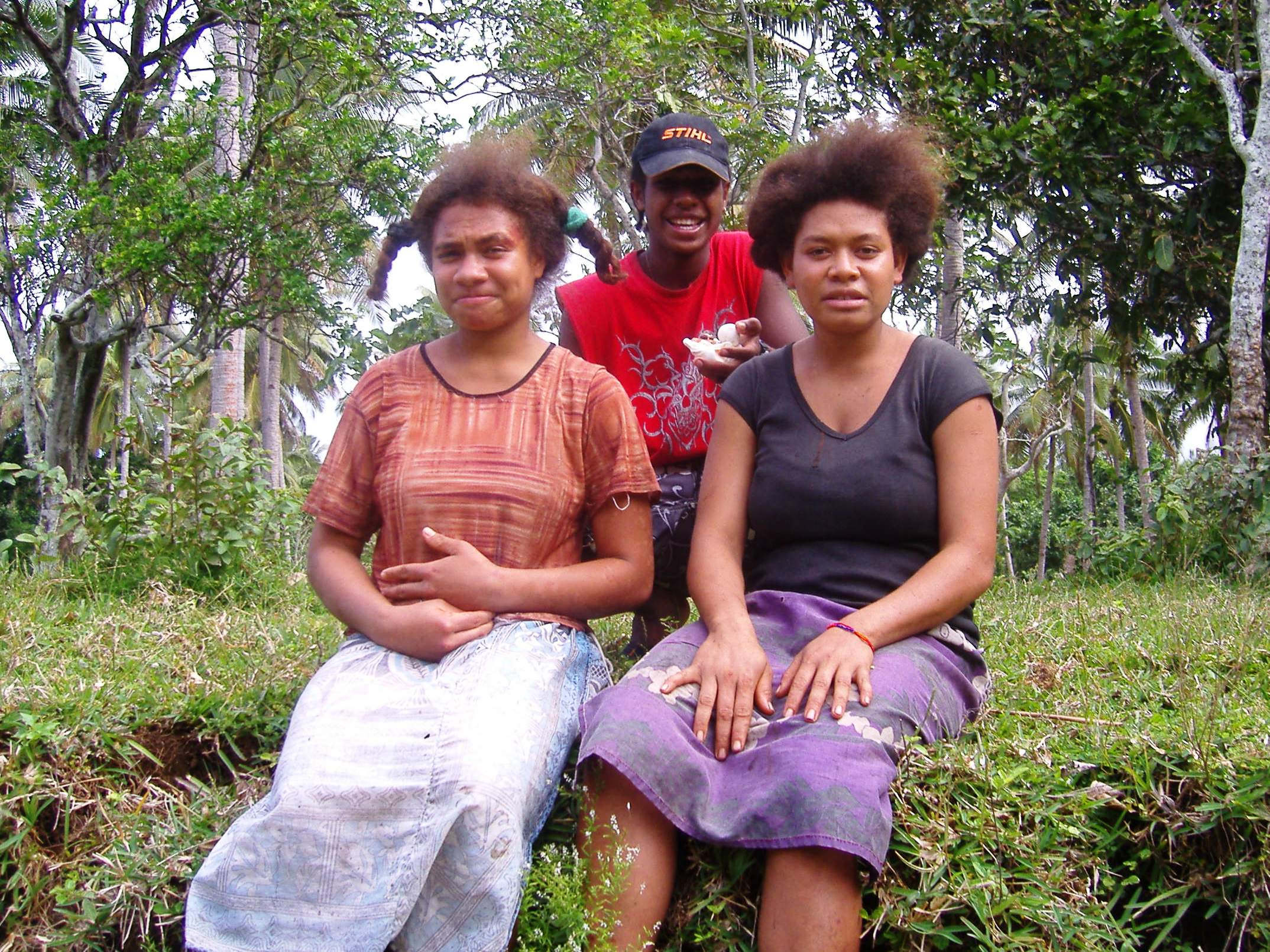
Local people

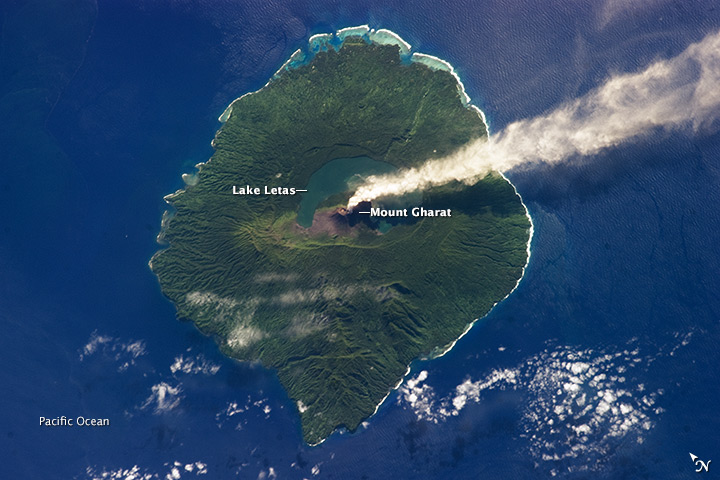
Gaua as seen from space
