= Sola, Vanuatu =

Sola
- Village
- Location in Vanuatu
- Coordinates: 13°52′30″S 167°33′00″E
- Country: Vanuatu
- Province: Torba Province
- Island: Vanua Lava
- Time zone: UTC+11 (VUT)

Sola is the capital village of Torba Province in Vanuatu. It is on the island of Vanua Lava.

Near the village of Sola is the volcano Mount Suretamate (also called Sürétimiat or Sere'ama). The Selva and Alket rivers pass north of the village. Fauna include saltwater crocodiles introduced by Steve Irwin, and an invasive species, fire ant.

== Name ==
The name Sola [sola] comes from the Mota language, which was used as the primary language of the Melanesian Mission. Locally, the island is called Sol [sɔl] in Vurës, and Asol [aˈsɔl] (with locative prefix a-) in the immigrant Mwotlap language. All of these terms come from a Proto-Torres-Banks form *sola.

== Transportation ==
The village is served by Vanua Lava Airport.

== Climate ==
Climate data for Sola (1971–2008)
Month	Jan	Feb	Mar	Apr	May	Jun	Jul	Aug	Sep	Oct	Nov	Dec	Year
Mean daily maximum °C (°F)	30.4 (86.7)	30.5 (86.9)	30.4 (86.7)	30.0 (86.0)	29.1 (84.4)	28.5 (83.3)	27.9 (82.2)	27.7 (81.9)	27.9 (82.2)	28.5 (83.3)	29.2 (84.6)	30.0 (86.0)	29.2 (84.5)
Mean daily minimum °C (°F)	23.4 (74.1)	23.5 (74.3)	23.5 (74.3)	23.6 (74.5)	23.6 (74.5)	23.2 (73.8)	22.9 (73.2)	22.7 (72.9)	22.8 (73.0)	23.1 (73.6)	23.4 (74.1)	23.4 (74.1)	23.3 (73.9)
Average rainfall mm (inches)	395.8 (15.58)	329.7 (12.98)	403.9 (15.90)	458.6 (18.06)	376.1 (14.81)	333.6 (13.13)	255.9 (10.07)	236.0 (9.29)	246.4 (9.70)	314.0 (12.36)	387.0 (15.24)	371.4 (14.62)	4,108.4 (161.74)
Average rainy days (≥ 0.2 mm)	21	20	24	23	20	19	17	16	17	17	18	19	231
Source: World Meteorological Organization
