= Banks Islands =

Group of islands in Torba, Vanuatu

The Banks Islands

The Banks Islands (in Bislama Bankis) are a group of islands in northern Vanuatu. Together with the Torres Islands to their northwest, they make up the northernmost province of Torba. The island group lies about 40 km (25 mi) north of Maewo, and includes Gaua and Vanua Lava, two of the 13 largest islands in Vanuatu. In 2009, the islands had a population of 8,533. The island group's combined land area is 780 km^{2} (300 sq mi).

== Geography ==
The largest island is Gaua (formerly called Santa Maria), which has a rugged terrain, rising to Mount Gharat, an active volcano at the centre of the island, at 797 m (2,615 ft). Gaua's freshwater Lake Letas, in its volcanic crater, is the largest lake in Vanuatu. A slightly smaller island in the group, Vanua Lava, is higher, at 946 m (3,104 ft); it too has an active volcano: Mount Suretamate (also spelled Süretimiat or Sere'ama, 921 m (3,022 ft)). To the east of Vanua Lava are two islets in the groupo, Ravenga and Kwakea (also spelled Qakea). Sola, the provincial capital, is on Vanua Lava. The third largest island in the group, Ureparapara (also known as Parapara), is an old volcanic cone that has been breached by the sea, forming a bay, known as Divers Bay, on its east coast.

To the east of these larger islands lie a number of smaller ones. The furthest north of them, 50 km (31 mi) northeast of Ureparapara, is Vet Tagde (also known as Vot Tande or Vat Ganai), which is an extinct volcano that last erupted 3.5 million years ago. Other small islands in this eastern chain in the Banks Island group include the Rowa Islands (also called the Reef Islands), which are a few very small, low islands on a coral atoll. Mota Lava is the largest and highest (411 m) of this eastern chain of islands; off its southern coast, attached by high corals that can be waded through at low tide, is the tiny islet of Ra. The islands of Mota, Merig, and Merelava complete the southeastern part of the archipelago.

=== Islands ===
Island name	Area (km^{2})	Population	Capital	Peak	Height (meter)	Municipality	Coordinates
Vot Tande	0.24	-	-	...	76	Mota Lava	13°15′33″S 167°38′34″E
Ureparapara	39	437	Ley (Lesereplag)	Mt Towlap	764	Ureparapara	13°32′S 167°20′E
Vanua Lava	330	2623	Sola	Mt Suretamate	921	Vanua Lava	13°48′S 167°28′E
Mota	9.5	683	Veverao	Mt Tawe	411	Mota	13°51′S 167°42′E
Mota Lava	31	1451	Lahlap	Mt Tuntog	243	Mota Lava	13°39′S 167°42′E
Ra (Aya)	0.5	189	Ra	...	...	Mota Lava	13°43′S 167°37′E
Mere Lava	15	647	Tasmate	Mt Teu (Star Peak)	833	Mere Lava	14°27′S 168°4′E
Gaua	330	2491	Jolap	Mt Gharat	767	Gaua	14°15′54″S 167°31′12″E
Merig	0.5	12	Levolvol	...	125	Mere Lava	14°19′S 167°48′E
Rowa (Reef Islands)	0.1	-	-	...	2	Mota Lava	13°37′S 167°31′E
Banks Islands	780	8.533	Sola	Mt Suretamate	921	6 municipalities	13°55′S 167°34′E

=== Economy ===
The principal economic activity is subsistence agriculture, although copra, coffee and (on Gaua) cacao are grown for export. The sulphur deposits of Mount Suretamate on Vanua Lava were formerly worked by a French company. Tourism is increasingly important on the islands, which can be reached by airplane.

=== Transport ===
There are airports on Mota Lava, Vanua Lava and Gaua, served by Air Vanuatu, which operates a few flights each week and Air Taxi Vanuatu as requested. Ships come to these islands, principally to pick up the products being exported, but they will also take passengers.

== History ==
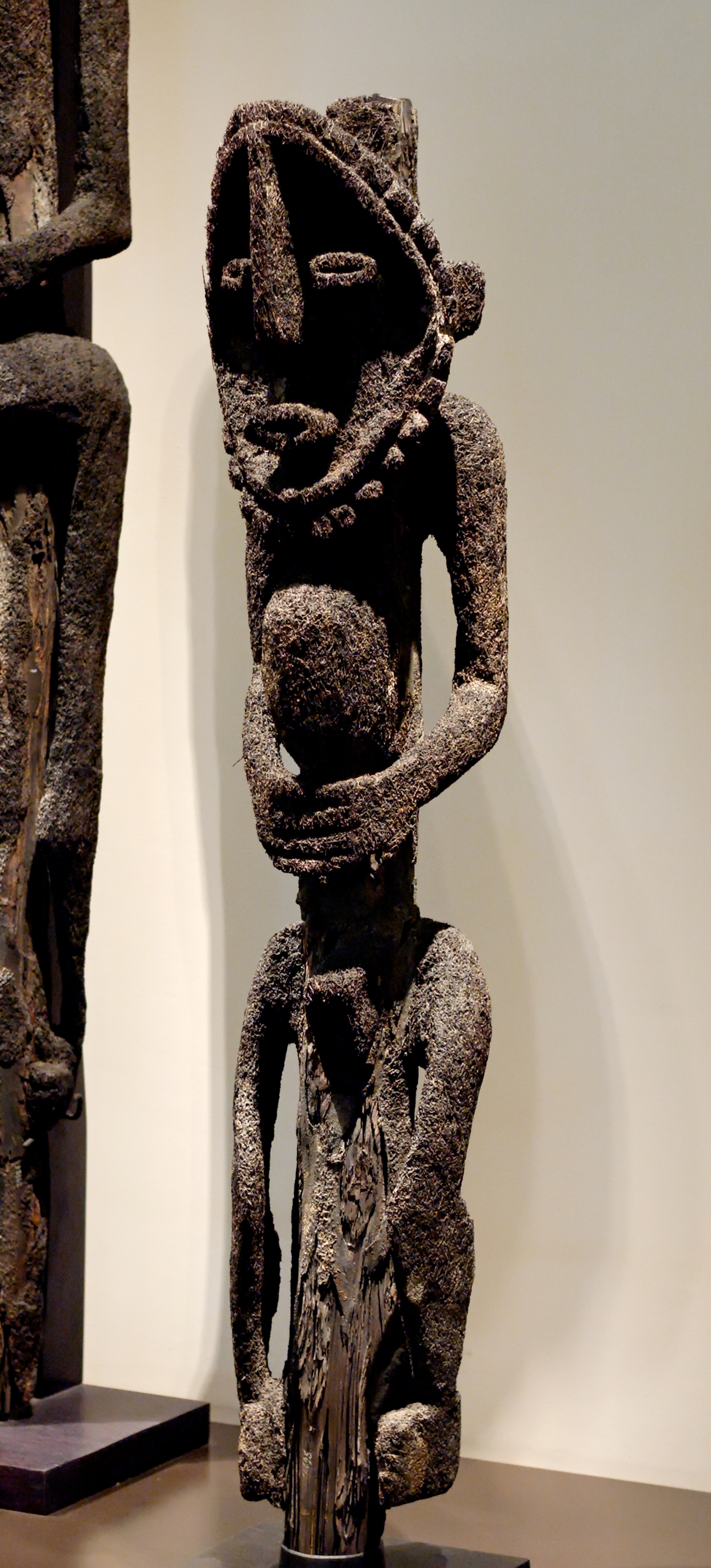
Tree fern statue of a spirit from Gaua, 19th century

Like the rest of Vanuatu, the Banks Islands were first settled around the 12th century BCE by Austronesian navigators belonging to the Lapita culture. Archaeologists have found ancient obsidian in Motalava, Vanua Lava and Gaua, and they have found Lapita pottery on Motalava.

Between 25 and 29 April 1606, the Banks Islands became the first part of Vanuatu to be discovered by a European explorer: A Spanish expedition led by the Portuguese explorer Pedro Fernández de Quirós sailed past Merelava and stopped at Gaua before landing on Espiritu Santo and establishing a short-lived colony there. Merelava was charted as San Marcos, Mota Lava as Lágrimas de San Pedro (St. Peter's tears), Vanua Lava as Portal de Belén (Stable at Bethlehem), and Gaua as Santa María.

Captain James Cook explored Vanuatu in 1774, and believed he had seen the whole chain, but he did not see the Banks Islands. They were explored by William Bligh, of the British Navy, and named after his patron, Sir Joseph Banks. They were charted by Matthew Flinders. Vanua Lava was first explored by a New Zealand bishop, George Augustus Selwyn in 1859.

== Languages ==
The 15 languages of the Banks Islands
Island	Language	# speakers
Ureparapara	Lehali	200
Ureparapara	Löyöp	240
Motalava	Volow	1
Motalava	Mwotlap	2100
Vanua Lava	Lemerig	2
Vanua Lava	Vera'a	500
Vanua Lava	Vurës	2000
Vanua Lava	Mwesen	10
Mota	Mota	750
Gaua	Nume	700
Gaua	Dorig	300
Gaua	Koro	250
Gaua	Olrat	3
Gaua	Lakon	800
Merelava	Mwerlap	1100

The inhabitants of the Banks Islands speak 15 different languages. Several are endangered, being spoken by no more than a few hundred — and, in some cases, no more than a handful - of last speakers.

All of these languages belong to the Oceanic subgroup of the Austronesian language family.
