= Vanua Lava =

Island in Vanuatu

Native name: Vōnōlav, Vunulava, Vunulāv
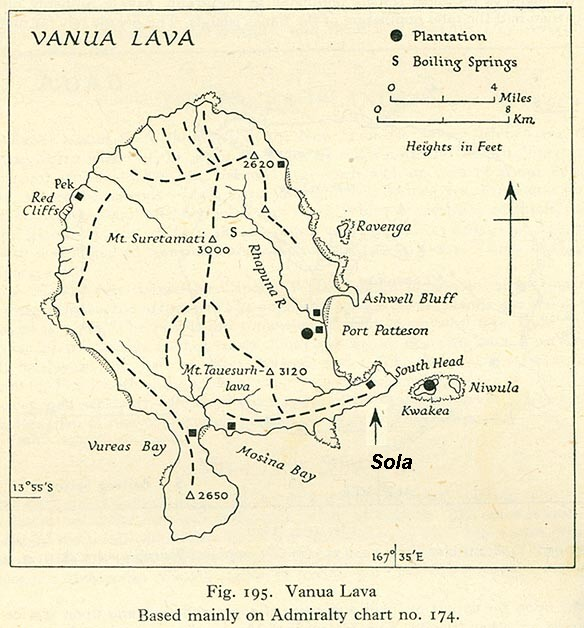
- Map of Vanua Lava

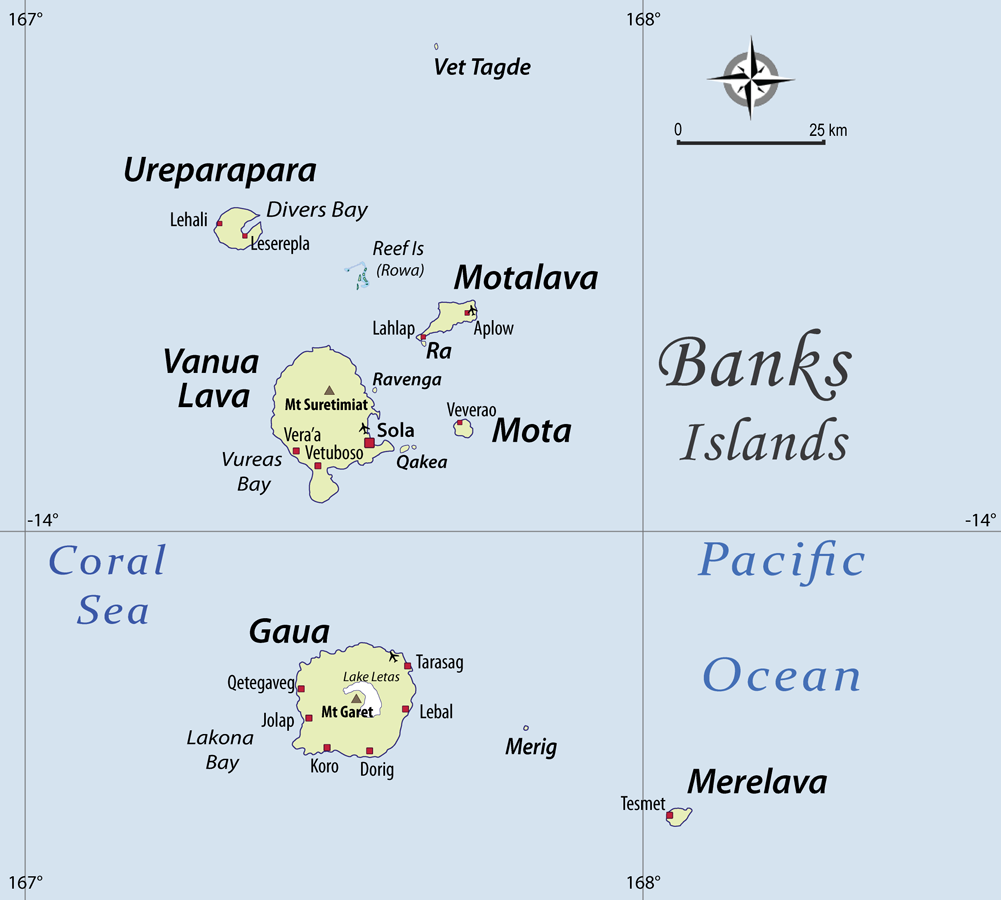

Geography
- Location: Pacific Ocean
- Coordinates: 13°48′S 167°28′E
- Archipelago: Vanuatu, Banks Islands
- Area: 314 km^{2} (121 sq mi)
- Highest elevation: 921 m (3022 ft)
- Highest point: Mount Suretamate

Administration
- Vanuatu
- Province: Torba Province
- Largest settlement: Sola

Demographics
- Population: 2,623 (2009)
- Pop. density: 8.35/km^{2} (21.63/sq mi)

Vanua Lava is the second largest of the Banks Islands in Torba Province, Vanuatu, after slightly larger Gaua.

It is located about 120 km north-northeast of Espiritu Santo and north of Gaua.

== Name ==
The name Vanua Lava [βanua laβa] comes from the Mota language, which was used as the primary language of the Melanesian Mission. Locally, the island is called Vōnōlav [βonoˈlaɸ]/[βʊnʊˈlaɸ] in Vurës and Mwesen, Vunulava [funulafa] in Vera'a, and Vunulāv [βunuˈlɒ̝ɸ] in Lemerig. In the immigrant language Mwotlap, it is referred to as Apnōlap [apnʊˈlap] (with the locative prefix a-). Cognates in other Torres-Banks languages include Lo-Toga Venielave [βəniəlaˈβə] and Lakon Vanōlav [βanʊˈlaɸ]. All of these terms come from a Proto-Torres–Banks form *βanua laβa "Large Land".

== History ==
Vanua Lava was first sighted by Europeans during the Spanish expedition of Pedro Fernández de Quirós from 25 to 29 April 1606. The island’s name was then charted as Portal de Belén (“Nativity scene” in Spanish).

Vanua Lava was first explored by a New Zealand bishop, George Augustus Selwyn, in 1859. The sulfur deposits of Mt. Suretamate were at one time worked by a French company. Copra is the chief export.

== Geography ==
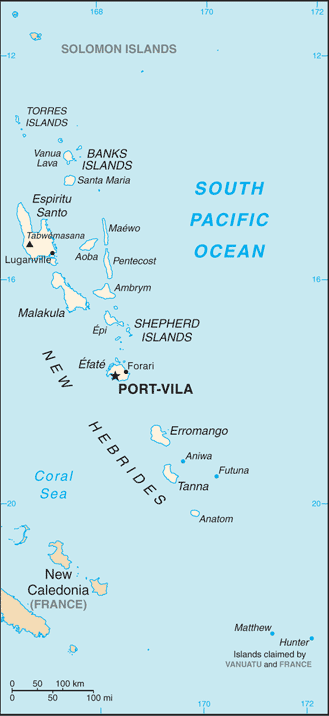
Location of the Banks Islands in the north of Vanuatu

The island measures about 25 km north-to-south and 20 km east-to-west. It has a land area of 314 km². The capital of Torba province, Sola, is located on the east side of the island, on Port Patteson.

The highest altitude on the island is 946 metres (3,104 feet). Mount Suretamate (from Mota), also known as Suretimiat or Seretimiat (from Vurës) and Sere'ama (from Lemerig and Vera'a), which stands 921 metres (3,022 feet)) high, is an active volcano: Its last major eruption was in 1965. The island has two natural harbours, Port Patteson in the east and Vureas Bay (Vurës) in the southwest. To the east of the island are the islets of Kwakea and Ravenga. Waterfall Bay lies on the west side of the island.

== Natural history ==
A 14,850 ha tract, encompassing the upper slopes of Mount Suretamate and much of the northeastern coastline of the island, has been recognised as an Important Bird Area (IBA) by BirdLife International because it supports populations of Vanuatu megapodes, Vanuatu imperial pigeons, Tanna fruit doves, red-bellied fruit doves, palm lorikeets, cardinal myzomelas, Vanuatu honeyeaters, fan-tailed gerygones, long-tailed trillers, streaked fantails, Melanesian flycatchers, buff-bellied monarchs, southern shrikebills, Santo thicketbirds and Vanuatu white-eyes. It is also home to seabird breeding colonies of collared and white-necked petrels. Other animals found on the island include coconut crabs and Banks flying foxes.

== Population and languages ==
The population of Vanua Lava was 2,623 in the 2009 census.

Vanua Lava is home to four indigenous languages: Vurës, with about 2000 speakers; Vera'a, with 500; and two dying languages, Mwesen, with 10 speakers, and Lemerig, with only 2 living speakers. Other languages on the island, spoken by migrant communities, include Mwotlap (on the northeastern coast) and Mota (in the east). The language most commonly spoken in Sola, the administrative capital, where people from different language backgrounds meet, is Bislama.

Vanua Lava evidently used to harbour more languages in the past, several of which have disappeared since the mid 19th century.

== Transportation ==
There is an airport on the island (IATA code SLH), to which Air Vanuatu flies three times a week. There is a single road on the island, but few vehicles.
