= Logophoricity =

Binding relation that may employ a morphologically different set of anaphoric forms

Logophoricity is a phenomenon of binding relation that may employ a morphologically different set of anaphoric forms, in the context where the referent is an entity whose speech, thoughts, or feelings are being reported. This entity may or may not be distant from the discourse, but the referent must reside in a clause external to the one in which the logophor resides. The specially formed anaphors that are morphologically distinct from the typical pronouns of a language are known as logophoric pronouns, a term originally coined by the linguist Claude Hagège. The linguistic importance of logophoricity is its capability to do away with ambiguity as to who is being referred to. A crucial element of logophoricity is the logophoric context, defined as the environment where use of logophoric pronouns is possible. Several syntactic and semantic accounts have been suggested. While some languages may not be purely logophoric (meaning they do not have logophoric pronouns in their lexicon), logophoric context may still be found in those languages; in those cases, it is common to find that in the place where logophoric pronouns would typically occur, non-clause-bounded reflexive pronouns (or long-distance reflexives) appear instead.

== Definition ==
Logophoricity is characterized as a binding relation which distinctly co-references a clause-external antecedent with a clause-internal anaphor which, under certain conditions, may surface with different morphological forms. Those morphological forms have been called logophoric pronouns, and, if they occur, they must be used in a clausal environment known as the logophoric context. Although logophoricity may be indicated by the difference in morphology, more importantly, it is marked by the logophoric context. Meanwhile, logophoric context does not necessitate the occurrence of logophoric pronouns. Logophoric pronouns may not exist in the lexicon of some languages, but in those languages, elements of logophoricity may still occur underlyingly in the form of logophoric contexts. Notably, linguists have discovered that in those cases, non-clause-bounded reflexive pronouns (or long-distance reflexives) are often found in place of logophoric pronouns. While it is often the case that the referent of the logophor is situated in the matrix clause while the logophor itself resides in the subordinate clause, a logophoric referent does not necessarily need to stay within the same complex sentence as the logophor. A logophor may refer to an entity mentioned beyond that sentence, such as earlier in a paragraph or anywhere in the discourse.

Other terms commonly used include logophoric markers/logophoric markings, which many later researchers preferred to use; it was found that the distinction between simply logophoric pronouns and reflexive anaphora in logophoric context was not sufficient. This is because logophoricity may manifest under different conditions cross-linguistically, which entails more than simply whether a language employs explicit logophoric markers or not. While it is common for a language with a logophoric system to employ logophoric pronouns, this does not mean explicit logophoric markers consist only of logophoric pronouns. For instance, a logophoric marker may surface as an affix – a morphological change is still present, but not all purely logophoric languages have logophoric pronouns.

In terms of the role of logophoricity in languages, the existence of logophoric markers allows for the reduction of referential ambiguity. For instance, him in English may be used in a logophoric context, but cannot be called a logophor. In a context such as the one below, there is ambiguity as to who the pronoun him is referring to:

(1)

a. Mr. Smithi said that Lucy had insulted himi. 

b. Mr. Smithi said that Lucy had insulted himj.[1]

In the first example, the pronoun him references the subject, Mr. Smith, whose speech is being reported and who resides in the matrix clause. In the latter example, the pronoun him references some other individual.

Specifically, referential unambiguity is achieved by logophoricity through:

1. An explicit logophoric marker (such as a logophoric pronoun), which allows for reference tracking (being able to keep track of who/what is being referred to during a discourse), and
2. An absence of any explicit logophoric marker to any entity that is not the target referent, showing disjoint reference (when an anaphor is deliberately shown not to refer to an entity).

Although according to the originator of the term, logophoric pronouns are considered a type of anaphora, and although it does embody a binding relation with an antecedent, logophoricity cannot be accounted for by Chomsky's Binding Theory as other anaphora may be, because of its necessity to take on the perspective of an individual external to the event, and not the speaker. As such, logophoric contexts occur when anaphors refer to nominals in higher clauses (in other words, not locally); in that situation, the anaphor may either surface as a typical anaphor, an indirect reflexive, or a logophoric pronoun. The matter of indirect reflexives in logophoric contexts in particular, has been much debated.

While it has been noted that logophoric markers may be used typically when they reside in clauses introduced by verbs that reflect speech, thought, and feelings, there are no universal syntactic conditions for logophors. However, there is semantic commonality across languages; the introduction of logophors through mainly verbs of saying or reporting is cross-linguistic. Even so, many languages may extend their lexicon of logocentric verbs. In every language, the lexicon of logocentric verbs is determined semantically; clauses that contain logophoric markers are mainly introduced by verbs of saying and reporting, while logophoric contexts may also be introduced by verbs depicting mental or psychological state.

Stirling provided a logocentric verb hierarchy:

Communication > Thought > Psychological State > Perception

If a verb of a certain semantic category in a language is shown to trigger a logophoric context, then from its spot on the hierarchy, it and all the verb kinds to its left will also trigger a logophoric context.

== Background ==
=== Origin ===
The coinage of the term logophoric pronouns (also called logophors) came from Claude Hagège. Through the study of certain languages from the Niger-Congo family (such as Mundang, Tuburi, and Ewe), Hagège discovered a distinct set of pronouns being used to refer to an external, secondary speaker, rather than the primary speaker. Moreover, Hagège studied indirect reflexives (also called long-distance reflexives, non-clause-bounded reflexive pronouns, or free anaphors in later research) in Latin and Japanese, and noted that the African set of pronouns were also morphologically different from those reflexives, even though they were similar in function – both types of anaphors were used to refer to an individual other than the speaker currently relaying the information. Thus, he declared that those pronouns, while seemingly related to indirect reflexives, were a separate phenomenon, and gave them the name logophors. Subsequently, he concluded that logophors were a subcategory of anaphora (of the broad, traditional sense). Hagège was the first of many researchers to make the comparison between indirect reflexives and logophors, and to figure out how to differentiate them.

While the concept of logophoricity originated from Hagège's work, he explicitly focuses on logophoric pronouns, and how they may differ from indirect reflexives. George N. Clements' research, a year later, is considered an extension of Hagège's initial work, and gives a more expanded account of logophoricity, including going into more detail about the difference between indirect reflexives and logophoric pronouns. Clements, in his work, talked about logophoric pronouns as well, but he also went further and helped to provide a more cohesive concept of logophoricity as a general phenomenon. This allowed many other linguists to build on his account in the future.

According to Clements, logophoric pronouns are morphologically distinct from personal and reflexive pronouns as well, in addition to indirect reflexives. He delved into the concept Hagège posited that there are two different perspectives that may be referred to: the actual speaker of the discourse, or someone else whose speech, thoughts, or feelings are being reported. The latter perspective is used for an individual who maintains a distance from the events being reported. This distinction in perspective may lead the anaphor of a clause, in some languages, to take on different morphological forms – in other words, if meant to depict the perspective of an individual whose speech, thoughts, and feelings are reported, then languages like the one studied by Clements – Ewe – will have logophoric pronouns to explicitly refer to that individual, and no other possible person. These were the basic characteristics of logophoricity, which served as an important foundation for future research in the field. However, Clements did not provide much discussion on the semantic and pragmatic aspects of logophoricity.

=== Cross-linguistic variation ===
Notably, Lesley Stirling, in 1993, found it important to clarify that a language having explicit logophoric markers is not equivalent to having logophoric pronouns. In her writing, she gave Gokana as an example. In Gokana, there is no full, entirely morphologically distinct word to depict logophoricity. Instead, a logophoric marker is suffixed to the verb, while the ordinary pronoun would be left as is. This is possible as, besides Gokana's semantic and structural restrictions on where logophoricity appears, logophoric markers, when they do occur in a clause, may take on any grammatical function (subject, object, etc.). With that said, grammatical function also differs from language to language – in contrast to Gokana, some allow logophoric markers to take on only one role. In all languages with a logophoric system, however, it remains true that some change in morphology is used to distinguish between logophoric forms and personal and reflexive pronouns. Stirling also provided more semantic background on logophoricity by pointing out the role semantics had in choosing which verbs could trigger logophoric contexts. Describing them as logocentric verbs, he developed a hierarchy as a guide to which types of verbs languages may employ as logocentric verbs.

=== Syntactic restrictions on logophoric contexts ===
In 2001, Gerrit J. Dimmendaal discussed the syntactic constraints on logophoric contexts which had been posited by linguists; it was widely assumed that whether a context was logophoric or not depended mainly on where the domain of the logophoric marker was within the boundaries of the complex sentence that contained it. Saying that the logophoric marker and its referent must occur within a single complex sentence implies that any potential logophoric reference must reside either within the root clause or the external clause. At the time, this constraint was not questioned, and it was assumed that as long as a language employs distinct pronouns that co-refer with an entity in an adjacent clause, then it meant that the language has logophoric markers. Dimmendaal argues that this provides an incomplete account of logophoricity, and shows that, as long as reference tracking is made clear, environments for logophoric marking go well beyond bi-clausal contexts, and may extend to the paragraph, or even to the entire discourse.

=== Indirect reflexivization ===
A problem discussed by Clements, and several later linguists as well, was the matter of indirect reflexives. Given the nature of logophoricity and its ability to reference a subject external to the clause which contains the pronoun, linguists have posited logophoricity as an exceptional case to Chomsky's Binding Theory, as it does not need to follow the same conditions as typically occurring anaphors. A riddle first put forward by Hagège was once again put into question at this point:

Stirling described the situation as such: linguists had found it strange that certain pronouns were being used in the same strict conditions as logophoric pronouns are typically employed under, both semantically and structurally; yet, these pronouns were not logophoric pronouns – they were simply what those languages used respectively as reflexive pronouns, but specifically with clause-external antecedents. Because reflexives must be bound within their domain (Condition A of Binding Theory), long-distance reflexives such as those found in Latin, Greek, and Japanese should not be able to occur in a logophoric context.

Clements, when tackling this problem, had been working with Latin and Classical Greek, both of which have a logophoric use of reflexive pronouns. The problem arisen from the discussion about indirect reflexivization in these two languages was whether or not the referent (the subject) of that indirect reflexive needed to be positioned within the same clause as the indirect reflexive on the surface, or whether it only needed to be deep in the structure. This problem was known as the subjecthood condition. It was later decided that the indirect reflexives in Latin and Greek have a homophonous counterpart, which was functionally the same as Ewe's logophoric pronouns.

In 2006, Eric Reuland, in his review of Mira Ariel's work on NP antecedents, proposed another explanation: he stated that long-distance reflexives could be said to have logophoric interpretation due to the fact that in some languages and under some circumstances, syntactic binding may not be a necessity. In other words, syntactic binding is not a universal requirement and logophoricity is not the sole exception to the Binding Theory. Reuland focused on the concept that not abiding to binding conditions was not, in fact, an oddity; it only seemed so because so many languages do actually work under the strict conditions of binding. However, whether or not binding is required depends on some conditions. The more prominent an antecedent has been throughout a discourse, the more accessible it is; as such, Reuland based his reasoning for long-distance reflexives in logophoric interpretations on Ariel's prediction that whether a pronoun or reflexive may be used in a sentence, it depended not on the binding conditions, but on the accessibility of the antecedent. For instance, reflexives require higher accessibility than pronouns, so as long as the desired referent has been prominent enough in the discourse, a reflexive may be used in the sentence, regardless of binding.

== Types of logophors ==
=== Logophoric pronouns ===
Logophoric pronouns (a.k.a. logophors) are anaphors that distinguish the individual to which they refer from the speaker themselves who uses them in indirect speech. Traditionally, they are required to:

1. Occur in the scope of an attitude predicate such as "believe" or "say" in English.
2. Refer to the bearer of the attitude, such as the subject of "believe" or "say" in English.

It is not necessary that the clause containing the logophoric pronoun be subordinate to the clause containing the antecedent. The logophoric pronoun may occur at any depth of embedding. In fact these pronouns do not require a cosentential antecedent – the antecedent can be several sentences back.

==== Distinct logophoric pronouns: Ewe ====
Ewe is a language of the Niger-Congo family that exhibits formally distinct logophoric pronouns. The third-person singular pronoun yè is used only in the context of indirect discourse, e.g. when reporting speech and not quoting it. These special forms are a means of unambiguously identifying the nominal co-referent in a given sentence. In the following examples, (2a) contains the logophoric pronoun yè, while (2b) contains the normal third-person pronoun e. Which pronoun is used determines whether the pronoun refers to the speaker of the proposition (Kofi) or a different individual.

Kofi be yè-dzo
Kofi say LOG-leave
'Kofi_{i} said that he_{i} left.'

Kofi be e-dzo
Kofi say pro-leave
'Kofi_{i} said that he/she_{j} left.'

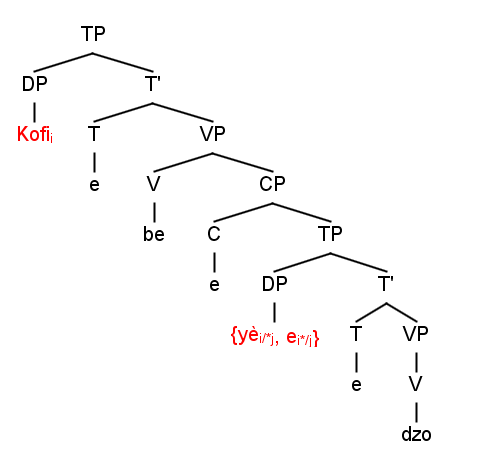
Adapted from Clements (1972), this tree diagram for example (2) illustrates the different co-reference possibilities for a logophoric pronoun versus a normal pronoun.

The syntax tree shows that the antecedent and logophoric pronoun in (a) are co-referential across a clausal boundary. Notably, logophoric pronouns such as yè may occur at any level of embedding within the same sentence. Additionally, if the antecedent is already established previously within the discourse, the antecedent with which the logophoric pronoun has a co-reference relation need not be in the same sentence.

The semantic condition imposed on the use of these logophors is that the context in which they appear must be reflective of another individual's perception, and not the speaker's subjective account of the linguistic content being transmitted; however, a purely semantic account is insufficient in determining where logophoric pronouns may appear. More specifically, even when the semantic conditions which license the use of logophors are satisfied, there may be additional syntactic conditions which determine whether or not logophoric pronouns actually occur in a sentence. Clements demonstrates that Ewe logophoric pronouns may only be introduced by clauses headed by the complementizer be. In Ewe, be is a clause-typing element that introduces clauses in which the feelings, thoughts, and perspective of an individual other than the speaker are communicated. Thus, although it is primarily the discursive context which licenses the use of logophoric pronouns in Ewe, syntactic restrictions are also important in determining the distribution of pronouns in direct and indirect discourse.

==== Wan ====
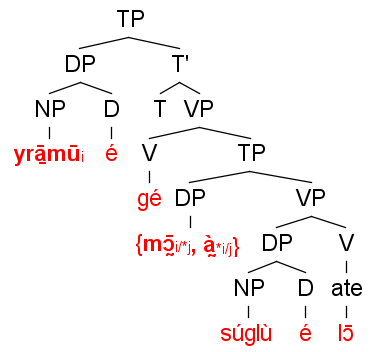
This tree shows how the logophoric pronoun, mɔ̰̄, and third-person pronoun, à̰, can occupy the same space in the same sentence, yet refer to different individuals.

In Wan, a language spoken primarily in the Ivory Coast, the logophoric pronouns ɓā (singular) and mɔ̰̄ (plural) are used to indicate the speech of the subject of the verb of speaking introduced in the preceding clause. These logophoric pronouns occur with verbs which denote mental activities and psychological states and are often used often for instances of reported speech. Such verbs typically require that the person undergoing the activities and states to be referred to with a logophoric pronoun.

yrā̠mū é gé mɔ̰̄ súglù é lɔ̄
children DEF said LOG.PL manioc DEF ate
'The children_{i} said they_{i} had eaten the manioc.'

yrā̠mū é gé à̰ súglù é lɔ̄
children DEF said 3PL manioc DEF ate
'The children_{i} said they_{j} had eaten the manioc.'

In Wan, there is no distinction between use of the logophoric pronouns for second and third person, but the logophoric pronouns cannot be used to refer to the current speaker and instead, a first person pronoun is used. Logophoric pronouns occupy the same syntactic positions as personal pronouns. They can occur as subjects, objects, possessors, etc.

In casual conversation, use of the perfect form of the verb when presenting speech is often associated with logophoricity as it implies that the event is relevant to the reported situation and consequently, suggests that the current speaker is involved. In cases where the current speaker participates in the reported situation, logophoricity helps to distinguish the current speaker from characters within the situation. However, ambiguity arises because logophoric pronouns are used for both characters, so while they are distinguished from the current speaker, they are not distinguished from each other. This suggests that logophoric pronouns are not used to mark co-reference.

è gé kólì má̰,
3SG said lie be
'He_{i} said: It's not true.'

klá̰ gé dóō ɓāā nɛ̰́ kpái gā ɔ̄ŋ́ kpū wiá ɓā lāgá
hyena said QUOT LOG.SG.ALN child exact went wood piece enter LOG.SG mouth
'Hyena_{j} said my_{i,LOG} own child went to enter a piece of wood in his_{j,LOG} mouth.'
Alternative interpretation:
'His_{j,LOG} own child went to enter a piece of wood in my_{i,LOG} mouth.'

==== Clause-type and discourse role: Abe ====
Abe, a Kwa language spoken in the Ivory Coast, has two classes of third-person pronouns: o-pronouns and n-pronouns. O-pronouns are the equivalent of English free pronouns while n-pronouns are the equivalent of the co-referential use of English pronouns (i.e. a logophoric pronoun).' An o-pronoun abides by Principle B of Binding Theory in that it can not be co-indexed with the c-commanding NP. However, if the o-pronoun is in subject position of the subjunctive complement and embedded within kO-complements (i.e. a complement that causes logophoric effects), the pronoun exhibits the same contrast as languages that have logophoric pronouns. In particular, o-pronouns must be disjoint from the matrix subject, and n-pronouns are used as logophoric pronouns to express co-reference with the speaker.

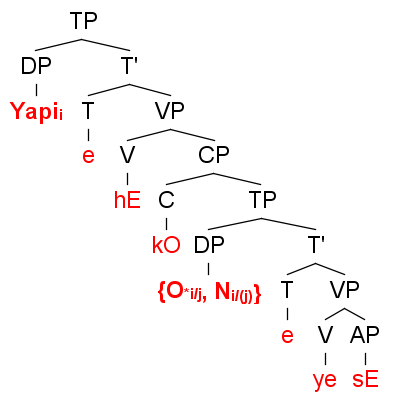
Adapted from Koopman and Sportiche (1989), illustrating the possible referential patterns of o-pronouns and n-pronouns in logophoric contexts.

In Abe, while all logophoric verbs are verbs of saying, logophoric effects are only seen with verbs taking a complement clause introduced by the complementizer kO. As the examples In (5) and (6) show, both ka 'tell' and hE 'said' are verbs of saying, but only the latter introduces a kO-complement. In (5), with a ye- complement clause both o-pronouns and n-pronouns can be co-indexed the matrix subject. But in (6), when a kO-complement clause is present, then n-pronouns are unambiguously logophoric and refer back to the speaker.

Yapi_{i} ka Api [ye O_{i,j} ye sE].
Yapi tell Api C 3sg is handsome
'Yapi_{i} told Api that he_{i,j} is handsome.'

Yapi_{i} ka Api [ye n_{i,j} ye sE].
Yapi tell Api C 3sg is handsome
'Yapi_{i} told Api that he_{i,j} is handsome.'

Yapi_{i} hE [kO O_{j} ye sE].
Yapi said C 3sg is handsome
'Yapi_{i} said that he_{j} is handsome.' (Yapi = Source)

Yapi_{i} hE [kO n_{i} ye sE].
Yapi said C 3sg is handsome
'Yapi_{i} said that he_{i} is handsome.' (Yapi = Source)

However, logophoricity is observed only within a subset of kO-complements; Koopman and Sportiche (1989) suggest that the antecedent must bears the discourse role of speech Source. For example, in (7), Api is not the speech source and so both the o-pronoun (7a) and the n-pronoun (7b) can be co-indexed (or not) with Api.

M hE Api_{i} [kO O_{i,j} ye sE].
I said.to Api C 3sg is handsome.
'I said to Api_{i} that she_{i,j} is handsome.' (Api ≠ Source)

M hE Api_{i} [kO n_{i,j} ye sE].
I said.to Api C 3sg is handsome.
'I said to Api_{i} that she_{i,j} is handsome.' (Api ≠ Source)

==== Finnish hän and he ====
The pronouns hän and he, which in standard Finnish are used as the singular and plural third-person pronouns respectively, are frequently used in a logophoric way in spoken informal Finnish. Spoken Finnish commonly uses the pronouns se and ne for human persons (while in standard Finnish these are used only of animals and inanimate things).

The pronouns hän and he in spoken Finnish are primarily used where another person is being paraphrased and specifically to refer to that person.

Liisa sanoi, että hän tulee huomenna käymään.
Liisa_{i} said that she_{i} would drop by tomorrow.

By contrast, in standard Finnish there is no logophoricity:

Liisa sanoi, että hän tulee huomenna käymään.
Liisa_{i} said that she_{i,j} would drop by tomorrow.

Even in informal Finnish, use of the logophoric hän and he is not required: the pronouns se and ne can also be used to refer to the person being paraphrased.

=== Logophoric verbal morphology ===
Logophoricity may also be marked through verbal morphology. This can occur either in isolation from logophoric pronouns or in conjunction with them. There are three types of verbal logophoricity:

- logophoric cross-referencing
- first person logophoricity
- logophoric verb affixes

==== Logophoric cross-referencing: Akɔɔse ====
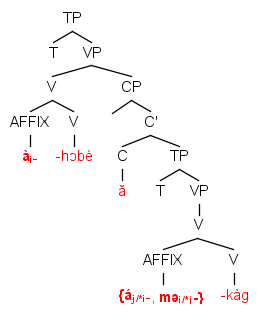
The affix indicating person, à, in the embedded clause and the affix indicating logophoricity, mə, can occupy the same syntactic position, yet they refer to different individuals.

Akɔɔse, a Bantu language spoken in Cameroon, uses logophoric cross-referencing. This language has a distinct verbal prefix used in subordinate clauses to indicate if the subject of the subordinate clause is co-referential with the subject of the matrix clause. In Akɔɔse, this kind of cross-referencing can only occur when the subject of the matrix clause is second- or third-person singular. This is a specific verbal prefix marking for logophoricity that is separate from the other verbal prefixes that Akɔɔse uses to indicate person and number for human subjects.

The prefix mə́- in Akɔɔse attaches to the verb to indicate that the subject of the subordinate clause is co-referential with the subject of the matrix clause.

à-hɔbé ǎ á-kàg
he-said RP he-should.go
'He_{i} said that he_{j} (someone else) should go'

à-hɔbé ǎ mə-kàg
he-said RP LOG-should.go
'He_{i} said that he_{i} (himself) should go'

Not all cross-referencing utilizes the same properties. In Akɔɔse, logophoric cross-referencing occurs without logophoric pronouns. Other languages, such as Logo, Kaliko, and Moru, may have both logophoric cross-referencing and logophoric pronouns. Languages with a logophoric cross-referencing system will always use it with singular referents and can, but not necessarily, use it with plural referents. Logophoric cross-referencing will also always be used with third person referents and can, but not necessarily, be used with second person referents.

==== First-person logophoricity: Donno Sɔ ====
A Dogon language spoken in Mali, Donno Sɔ, uses a first person marking to indicate logophoricity. Donno Sɔ has a system of verbal affixation where finite verbs within matrix clauses can optionally agree in person and number with its subject using suffixes. In subordinate clauses containing a logophoric subject, the verb is obligatorily inflected with a verb suffix which indicates a first person subject.

Oumar [inyemɛ jɛmbɔ paza bolu-m] miñ tagi
Oumar LOG sack.DEF drop left-1S 1S.OBJ informed
'Oumar_{i} told me that she_{i} had left without the sack.'
(lit. 'Oumar_{i} told me_{i} that I_{LOGO=OUMAR} left without the sack.')

The use of this verb suffix helps to differentiate between a logophoric context and direct speech. In direct speech, the speaker quotes the original speaker, e.g. 'Oumar_{i} told me_{j}, "I_{i} left without the sack"'. In this case, both the verb suffix and the pronouns referring to the original speaker would be in first person. In some cases where Donno Sɔ omits the subject, the use of this verb suffix to mark logophoricity is the only indication that the subordinate subject refers back to the main subject.

In the case of Donno Sɔ, the language also makes use of a logophoric pronoun, inyemɛ. Not all languages with first person marking of logophoricity also use logophoric pronouns. In Lotuko and Karimojong, first person marking is used, but instead of using a logophoric pronoun, they use a third person subject pronoun.

==== Logophoric verbal affix: Gokana ====
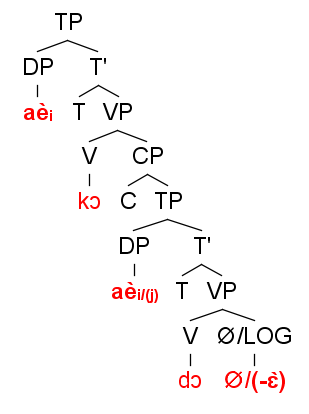
Adding the logophoric affix to the verb allows for a logophoric interpretation of this sentence.

Gokana is a language of the Benue-Congo family which uses the verbal suffix -EE (which has several phonological conditioned allomorphs) to indicate logophoricity.

aè_{i} kɔ aè_{j} dɔ̀
he said he fell
'He_{i} said that he_{j} fell'

aè_{i} kɔ aè_{i} dɔ-ɛ̀
he said he fell-LOG
'He_{i} said that he_{i} fell'

Unlike other types of logophoric systems (e.g. Ewe logophoric pronouns, Akɔɔse logophoric cross-referencing), the Gokana logophoric verbal suffix is not integrated within a system that marks person. Usually, logophoric marking contrasts with another regular marking indicating person, but in Gokana, the verbal affix only contrasts with its own absence.

Typically, logophoric marking makes clear which argument (i.e. subject, object, possessive) is co-referential. In Gokana, the verbal affix only shows that there is a logophoric element in the subordinate clause which is co-referential with the matrix subject. Consequently, sentences such as (10), where both the subject and the object of the subordinate contains are pronominal, are ambiguous: the embedded subject may be interpreted as co-referential with the matrix subject (10a), or the embedded object may be interpreted as co-referential with the matrix subject (10b). Since the logophoric marking is not attached to a pronoun but instead the verb, the co-reference relationship becomes unclear. Seeing as the logophoric marker does not indicate which co-reference relationship occurs, this sentence could be interpreted as either Lebare hit someone else, or someone else hit Lebare.

lébàreè_{i} kɔ aè_{i} div-èè e
Lebare said he hit-LOG him
'Lebare_{i} said he_{i} hit him_{j}

lébàreè_{i} kɔ aè div-èè e_{i}
Lebare said he hit-LOG him
'Lebare_{i} said he_{j} hit him_{i}'

In other logophoric systems where logophoricity is allowed to be used with certain persons (e.g. third person referents), it is necessary to use the appropriate logophoric marker. In Gokana, the logophoric verbal affix is required for third person referents, but not for singular second person referents. In fact, unlike many other logophoric systems, the logophoric verbal affix, although not preferred, can be used with first person referents.

=== Logophoric reflexives ===
Long-distance reflexive logophors occur when the antecedent is outside of the local domain. If binding were to be applied, it would have to cross a subject which normally would not be possible under the normal circumstances of binding theory. The concept of logophoricity would entail long-distance anaphors as being logophoric.

==== Bona fide logophoric reflexive: Avar ====
In Avar, a language in the Northeast Caucasian family spoken by the Avars in Dagestan, the simplex reflexive pronoun žiw is argued to be a bona fide logophoric pronoun. Because this simplex reflexive is strictly licensed by predicates of speech and perception, is subject-oriented, and has only negative constraints on anaphoric dependency (such as those which forbid its appearance in the clauses mentioned above), and has "the availability of bound-variable and referential interpretations," Rudnev (2017) argues that there exists a parallel between the Avar logophoric reflexive žiw and the logophoric pronouns attesed in Africa.

The Avar long-distance reflexives typically appears in finite complement clauses but can be separated from its antecedents across a non-finite clause boundary. Complement clauses such as the bracketed constituent in example (11) are only used for reporting speech and indirect questions in Avar. While the simple reflexive can be used as a logophor (11a), complex reflexives—such as žincago—prove ungrammatical (11b).

[žinca_{i} ču b-ič-il=ilan] ab-una wacas_{i}
self.ERG horse.ABS N-sell-FUT=COMP say-PST brother.ERG
‘Brother_{i} said that he_{i} would sell the horse.’
(lit. 'Brother_{i} said that self_{i} would sell the horse.')

*[žincago_{i} ču b-ič-il=ilan] ab-una wacas_{i}
self.ERG horse.ABS N-sell-FUT=COMP say-PST brother.ERG
[intended: ‘Brother_{i} said that he_{i} would sell the horse.’]

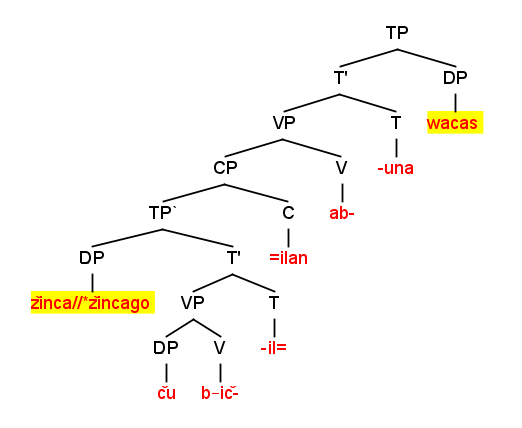
Adapted from Samedov 2003: §7.12, ex. 2, illustrating the fact that only the simplex reflexive žinca can refer to the reported speaker, while the complex reflexive žincago proves ungrammatical. (Both reflexives and 'speaker' are highlighted.)

Further, the only predicates able to license žiw are those with verbs of saying, belief or perception, without which "anaphoric dependencies between žiw and an antecedent across a clausal boundary cannot be established." The example in (12) demonstrates this fact, with its ungrammaticality due not only to the fact that the simplex reflexive cannot appear in coordinate (or adjunct) clauses when its antecedent is in the main clause but also because it is not licensed by an attitudinal predicate.

*pat’imat c’aq’ łik’aj jas j-igo, [hedinłidal rasulica žij j-eccule-j j-ik’-ana]
Patimat.ABS very good girl.ABS F-be.PRS that's-why Rasul.ERG self.F:ABS F-praise.PRS.PTCP-F F-be-PST
[intended: ‘Patimat_{i} is a very nice girl, which is why Rasul was praising her_{i}.’]

Žiw is subject-oriented: only a noun phrase which serves as the subject of the matrix predicate is able to bind the simplex reflexive, as exemplified in (13). Note also that the žij can only refer to the source of reported speech—a requirement shared by logophoric pronouns in § Ewe and § Abe.

jasał hudulalda bicun b-ugo [učitelał žij j-eccule-j j-ik’an=ilan]
girl.ERG friend.F:LOC tell.CVB N-be.PRS teacher.F:ERG self.F:ABS F-praise.PRS.PTCP-F F-be.PST=COMP
‘The girl_{i} told her friends that the teacher_{k} praised her_{i/*j/*k}.'
(lit. 'The girl told her friends that the teacher praised self.’)

Because the speaker of an attitude report, the "attitude holder", "...must be conscious of that the logophor's referent and themselves are one and the same"—a criterion known as the de se requirement, proposed by David Lewis in "Attitudes De Dicto and De Se" (1979)—Rudnev (2017) constructs the test below, wherein this requirement can identify a logophor based upon a certain context. Consider (14): (14a) and (14b) differ in the boldfaced pronouns; the ungrammaticality of (14b) is due to the fact that, as a reflexive logophor, ži=w is not able to co-refer with dibirica, since 'Dibir' doesn't understand that he—the speaker of the attitude report—is giving the speech in the video. This demonstrates that žiw follows the same de se requirement as other logophors.

<Context: Dibir is a participant in a reality show. He is watching a video recording of himself giving a speech at a contest where every participant must give a speech. He likes his own performance, but he is so drunk that he cannot recognise himself.>

dibirica abuna [hew wugila [žindie biššun b-oł’ara-w kandidat]]
Dibir.ERG say.PST he.ABS consider self.DAT most N-like.PST.PTCP-M candidate.ABS
‘Dibir said that he considered him the favourite candidate.’

*dibirica abuna [ži=w wugila [žindie biššun b-oł’ara-w kandidat]]
Dibir.ERG say.PST self.ABS consider self.DAT most N-like.PST.PTCP-M candidate.ABS
‘Dibir said he considered himself the favourite candidate.’

==== Non-clause-bounded reflexive: Icelandic ====
In Icelandic, the same reflexive forms are used as both obligatory clause-bound anaphors and as logophoric pronouns. The reflexives can bind with antecedents across multiple clause boundaries, exhibiting the effect of non-clause-bounded reflexives (NCBR).

Formaðurinn_{i} varð óskaplega reiður. Tillagan væri svívirðileg og væri henni beint gegn sér_{i} persónulega.
The-chairman became furiously angry. The-proposal was(SUBJ) outrageous and was(SUBJ) it aimed against self personally.
'The chairman_{i} became furiously angry. The proposal was outrageous, and it was aimed against him(self)_{i} personally.'

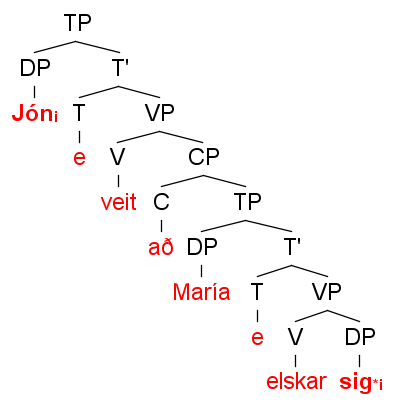
Adapted from Maling (1984), showing that the reflexive cannot bind with an antecedent outside a clause that is not in subjunctive mood.

The distribution of NCBR correlates with the grammatical mood. Specifically, the binding of the reflexive can only cross clauses of subjunctive mood, the second sentence of the example below. NCBR is prohibited across indicative mood as shown in 14a. below.

*Jon_{i} veit að María elskar sig_{i}
John knows that Maria loves(IND) REFL
'John_{i} knows that Maria loves him_{i}.'

Jon_{i} segir að María elski sig_{i}
John says that Maria loves(SUBJ) REFL
'John_{i} says that Maria loves him_{i}.'

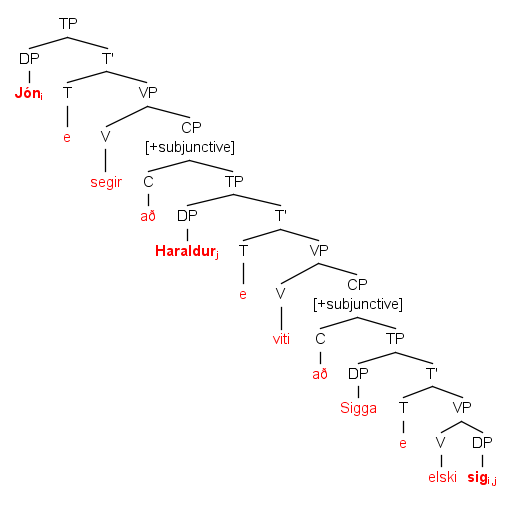
Adapted from Maling (1984), illustrating the 'trickling down' effect of subjunctive mood such as embedding clauses under segja.

When a verb selects a subjunctive complement, the subjunctive mood is not limited to that single clause. If the (structurally) higher verb takes a subjunctive complement, then the subjunctive mood can "trickle down" to the bottom of the tree, even if the intervening verbs often take indicative complements. Example 14) below illustrates this effect. When the indicative clause veit 'know' is embedded under a verb like segja 'say', the subjunctive mood trickles down and allows the reflexive to bind with the matrix subject.

Subjunctive mood is the mood typically used for indirect discourse and reportive contexts that reflect an individual's point of view. By allowing the reflexive to bind with the speaker, the combination of NCBR and the "trickling" effect of subjunctive mood captures the property of logophoric pronouns.

Jón_{i} segir að Haraldur_{j} viti að Sigga elski sig_{i,j}
Jon says(SUBJ) that Haraldur knows(SUBJ) that Sigga loves(SUBJ) REFL
'Jon_{i} says that Haraldur_{j} knows that Sigga loves him_{i,j}.'

==== Perspective-dependent reflexive logophors ====
===== Japanese =====
Prior to the first usage of the term "logophor", Susumu Kuno analyzed the licensing of the use of the Japanese reflexive pronoun zibun. The main aspect of zibun that sets it apart from an anaphor are the two characteristics it can portray: reportive or nonreportive styles. Reportive style narratives demonstrate a single point of view, that of the single narrator, while nonreportive narratives do not. Instead, there are no narrators present and the narrator can become any individual in the sentence. His analysis focused on the occurrence of this pronoun in discourse in which the internal feeling of someone other than the speaker is being represented.

Zibun in a constituent clause (A) [=a subordinate clause] is co-referential with a noun phrase (B) of the matrix sentence only if A represents an action or state that the referent of B is aware of at the time it takes place or has come to be aware of at some later time.

Kuno argues that one of the factors that permits the usage of zibun is a context in which the individual whom the speaker is referring to is aware of the state or event under discussion – i.e., this individual's perspective must be represented.

a. Johni wa, Mary ga zibuni ni ai ni kuru hi wa, sowasowa site-iru yo.
                            meet  to come days   excited  is
   'John is excited on days when Mary comes to see him.'

- sentence is considered grammatical because the individual being discussed (John) is aware that Mary comes to see him.

b. *Johni wa, Mary ga zibuni o miru toki wa, itu mo kaoiro ga warui soo da.
                      self     see  when     always complexion bad  I hear.
   'I hear that John looks pale whenever Mary sees him.'[20]

- sentence is ungrammatical because it is not possible for John to look pale when he is aware that Mary sees him.

As presented above, John's awareness of the event or state being communicated in the embedded sentence determines whether or not the entire sentences is grammatical. Similar to other logophors, the antecedent of the reflexive zibun need not occur in the same sentence or clause, as is the case for non-logophoric reflexives. This is demonstrated in the example above, in which the antecedent in a. occurs in the matrix sentence, while zibun occurs in the embedded clause. Although traditionally referred to as "indirect reflexives", the logophoric usage of pronouns such as zibun are also referred to as long-distance, or free anaphors.

The difference between zibun and kare (him), a normal anaphor in Japanese, is shown below:

John_{i}-wa [kare/zibun_{i}-o korosoo-to-sita] sono otoko-to mae-ni {atta koto-ga atta.}
John-TOP he/self-ACC kill-tried the man-with before {had met}
'John_{i} had before met the man who tried to kill him/self_{i}'

- implies that John knows that someone is trying to kill him

John_{i}-wa [kare/*zibun_{i}-o korosita] sono otoko-to mae-ni {atta koto-ga atta.}
John-TOP he/self-ACC killed the man-with before {had met}
'John_{i} had met before the man who killed him/*self_{i}

- John has no implication that someone is trying to kill him
- zibun is ungrammatical since John could not have been aware of being killed

In line with Clements' characterization of indirect reflexives, the logophoric pronoun is homophonous with the (non-logophoric) reflexive pronoun. Kuno later explicitly described Japanese as a language which permits the use of the reflexive pronouns for logophoric purposes. He argued that zibun is marked with a [+logo-1] symbol when it is associated with a noun phrase (NP) whose experience or perspective is represented in a proposition. It is this marking that distinguishes the non-logophoric use of zibun from its logophoric use. He also noted that the logophoric use of zibun is a particular instance of its use as an empathy expression in Japanese, which is demonstrated in example 11) above. More specifically, the clause that contains the logophoric pronoun zibun expresses a statement made by a logophoric NP in the matrix clause, or a feeling attributed to that entity. Thus, in Japanese, as in other languages exhibiting logophoricity, a logophoric pronoun may be introduced by a verb of saying or thinking in a complement clause.

===== Mandarin =====
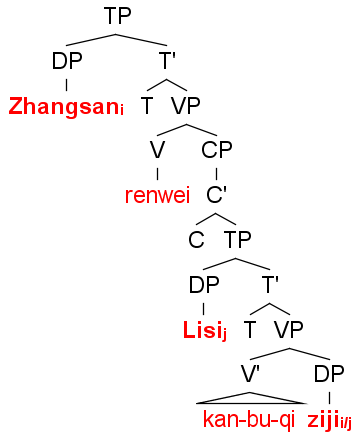
Logophoric pronoun

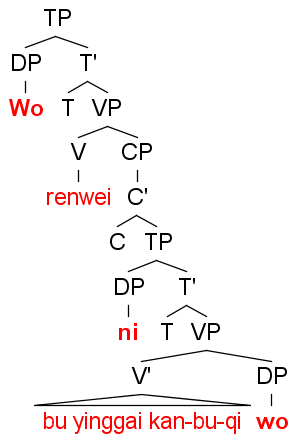
First-person pronoun

The Chinese logophoric pronoun ziji and the first-person pronoun wo can occupy the same syntactic position and refer to different individuals.

Liu does not consider Chinese to be a pure logophoric language, but rather contains logophors. Building on Sells' principle of three primitive roles (source, self, and pivot), the logophor ziji is similar to logophor pronouns in that it is "created by triggers such as speech, epistemic, psychological and perceptional verbs.". In Chinese, there are two types of long-range third-person reflexives: simplex and complex. They are ziji and Pr-ziji (pronoun morpheme and ziji), respectively. The relationship between these reflexives and the antecedents is logophoric. The distance between the reflexives and their antecedents can be many clauses and sentences apart demonstrating the long-distance relationship between the logophor and the antecedent.

Zhangsan_{i} renwei [Lisi_{j} kan-bu-qi ziji_{i/j}]
Zhangsan think Lisi look-not-up self
'Zhangsan_{i} thinks Lisi_{j} looks down on him_{i}/himself_{j}.'

Wo renwei "ni bu yinggai kan-bu-qi wo."
I think, "You should not look down on me."

In the example above, (a) shows that the Chinese ziji can be used as a locally bound anaphor, as well as a long-distance logophor.

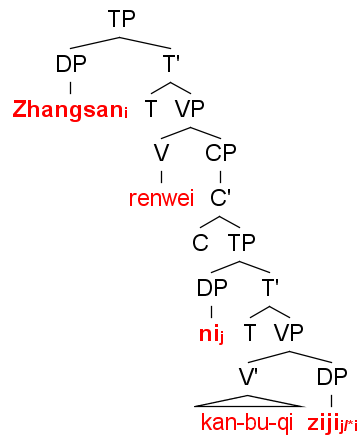
The second-person pronoun, ni, blocks the long-distance reading of ziji, so it cannot refer to Zhangsan. This is because of differing POV features of Zhangsan and ni.

In Chinese, there exists a blocking effect in which the long-distance reading of ziji is not possible because of a difference in point-of-view (POV) features between ziji and the embedded CP. One of these environments that cause blocking is when the third-person embedded subject in example a is replaced with the first-person or second-person pronoun, as in example c. This replacement restricts the referencing of ziji to only the local antecedent.

Zhangsan_{i} renwei [ni_{j} kan -bu -qi ziji_{j/*i}]
Zhangsan think you look -not -up self
'Zhangsan_{i} thinks you_{j} look down on *him_{i}/yourself_{j}'

In the example above, ziji can only refer to the second-person pronoun ni, as ziji takes the POV feature of the embedded subject. Here, ni has the second-person POV feature. The POV of the matrix subject is third person, which clashes with the embedded CP subject's POV of second person.

While the logophoric use of Pr-ziji is optional, its primary role is to be an emphatic or intensive expression of pronoun. Emphatic use is shown in example 10. This example shows that substituting the Pr-ziji (here, taziji) for ziji can reduce the emphasis and suggest logophoric referencing

Lao Tong Bao_{i} suiran bu hen jide zufu shi zenyang "zuoren", dan fuqin de qinjian zhonghou, ta_{i} shi qinyan kanjian de; taziji_{i} ye shi guiju ren...
Old Tong Bao although not very recall grandpa be what {sort of man} but father POS diligence honesty he just {with his own eyes} see POS himself also be respectable man
'Although Old Tong Bao_{i} couldn't recall what sort of man his grandfather was, he_{i} knew his father had been hardworking and
honest—he had seen that with his own eyes. Old Tong Bao himself_{i} was a respectable person;...'

== Syntactic accounts ==
There has been much discussion in linguistic literature on the type of approach that would best account for logophoricity. Syntactic accounts have been attempted within the context of Government and binding theory. More specifically, Binding Theory organizes nominal expressions into three groups: (i) anaphors, (ii) pronominals, and (iii) R-expressions. The distribution and grammaticality of these are governed by Conditions A, B, and C

Condition A: An anaphor must be bound within its domain; that is, it must be c-commanded by its co-referent antecedent. An element's 
             domain is the nearest maximal projection (XP) with a specifier.
Condition B: A pronoun must be free within its domain.
Condition C: R-expressions must be free.

Anaphors are not referential in and of themselves; they must be co-indexed to an antecedent. Problems arise when the antecedent falls outside the anaphor's local domain, occurring inside the same sentence or even in a previous one. Minkoff argues that logophors therefore form a special class of anaphors that may be linked to a referent outside their projected domain, categorizing them as a particular subset of anaphora that refer to the "source of a discourse" - i.e., the original (secondary) speaker, not the messenger relaying the information. Alternatively, Stirling (1993) contends that logophors are not anaphors at all, as they violate Condition A of Binding Theory with their lack of a c-commanding relationship to the antecedent. In relation to this, logophors and long-distance reflexives can be found in overlapping contexts with non-logophoric personal pronouns; they are not in complementary distribution with pronouns as anaphors are. Logophors also fail to satisfy Condition B, as they necessarily have antecedents and so are not referentially free within their domain - thus, they are not true pronominals, based on this condition.

Stirling (1993) also points out that although certain syntactic constraints influence the distribution of logophoric forms (such as requiring that an antecedent be a grammatical subject), syntactic binding is not crucial, nor sufficient, to explain the mechanism behind this. For example, a logophoric antecedent is often restricted to the semantic role of "source" in a discourse, or the semantic role of "experiencer" of a state of mind. Additionally, whether or not a logophoric form may be used may also be contingent on the lexical semantics of the verb in the matrix clause. There have been attempts to move beyond a solely syntactic approach in recent literature.

=== Koster's (1984) free anaphors and opacity ===
Koster attempts to define logophors as a continuation of the concept of anaphors. Free or long-distance anaphors are able to take an antecedent beyond their domain subject; logophors can commonly be found in this situation. Three scenarios may allow these kinds of exceptions: (i) if the logophor is properly bound (e.g. c-commanded and co-indexed) by an antecedent outside its local domain; (ii) if accurately interpreted by an antecedent that does not c-command; or (iii) if accurately interpreted without an explicitly stated antecedent These lead to an extended version of Condition A that applies more generally to locality:

The dependent element (logophor) L is linked to an antecedent A if and only if A is contained within B, as in
                ... [B ... w ... L ...] ...
in which B is the minimal category containing A, L, and opacity factor w

Under this interpretation, domain is no longer limited to the maximal projection of the logophor. The opacity factor (w) is best described as a variable that takes a different value for different types of dependent elements (L); its role is to delineate domains with respect to category heads (V, N, A, or P). Koster gives the following example as illustration:

... V [PP P NP]

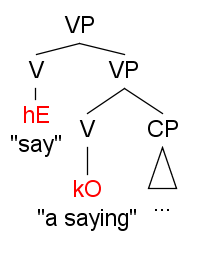
Koopman and Sportiche (1989) proposes that "kO" is not a complementizer, but instead is its own verb and taking a sentential complement.

Koster explains that P is the opacity factor, as head of the maximal projection PP, and "blocks" V from governing NP. Instead, the locality domain that governs NP is the maximal projection of its phrasal head—PP.

=== Koopman and Sportiche's (1989) logical variables ===
Koopman and Sportiche propose that logophoric pronouns are pronouns treated as logical variables and they yield logophoric effects in certain syntactic contexts. This analysis is based on Abe which, like many West African languages, has verbal complementizers that introduce certain types of clauses.

One of the major differences between the two classes of pronouns in Abe is that o-pronouns cannot be coindexed with a c-commanding antecedent that is a n-pronoun, regardless of the degree of embedding. This can be accounted for if the n-pronoun is not a referential element, but instead is a logical variable. It would then be expected that there exists an operator in complementizer which binds it. Another generalization found is that n-anaphors cannot have an o-pronoun antecedent, and vice versa. This can be captured by distinguishing the two pronouns by some feature like [+/-n]. If o-pronouns are [-n] and n-pronouns are [+n], these two can never be bound to each other. Binding would require the anaphor and the antecedent to be matching in feature (a parallel analogy would be the feature gender).

The logophoric effects can be accounted for by analyzing the complementizer kO as a verb taking a sentential phrase as its complement and a [+n] silent subject as its specifier. A schematic tree is given on the right. The silent subject receives the theta-role that the verb 'say' assigns to its subject, and the feature [+n] will force binding with n-pronouns. As a result, n-pronouns display the binding distribution observed with logophoric pronouns.

=== Minkoff's (2004) Principle E ===
Since logophors cannot be entirely accounted for given the conditions of canonical binding theory, modifications to this theory have been posited. For example, Minkoff suggests that logophoricity requires a new principle to be added to the set of conditions held by Binding Theory. He proposes Principle E which is stated thus:

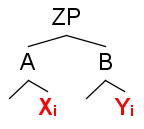
Node X is in the backward co-reference domain of node Y if there are two further nodes, A and B, such that A predicates B, A dominates X, and B dominates Y.

Principle E: A free SELF-anaphor must co-refer with, and be in the backward co-reference domain of, a Protagonist[28]

The backward co-reference domain is a specification of the general concept of domain found in binding theory. For anaphors, domain is defined as the smallest XP node in a tree with a subject that contains the DP. Backward co-reference domain dictates that node X is in the backward co-reference domain of node Y if there are two further nodes, A and B, such that A predicates B, A dominates X, and B dominates Y. This specification is meant to account for cases where self-anaphors are free and possess consciousness, but are still unacceptable. Minkoff addresses the two crucial differences his Principle E holds with binding theory. First it operates distinctly in the backward co-reference domain, rather than the more general operation of c-command.This means that it operates in terms of both syntax and semantics, where c-command uses only syntactic relations. Second, it is also sensitive to the attribution of consciousness, unlike the syntax-specific binding theory. Minkoff takes the ideas of source, self, and pivot from Sells' argument of logophoricity and argues that instead of these accounts, there is a protagonist. If he were to take these accounts, then Principle E would not demonstrate logophoricity because it would fail to account for situations when the phrase is logophoric but does not convey thoughts and feelings of a separate entity.

=== Charnavel's (2020) exempt anaphors ===
Condition A of binding theory, defined in the § Syntactic accounts section, imposes locality restraints on anaphors which require they be bound within their domain. However, in languages like English, French, Icelandic, Mandarin, Japanese, Turkish, and Uyghur, certain so-called "exempt anaphors" do not fit these requirements. That is, "exempt" anaphors are not bound in such a domain. Focusing on French, because exempt anaphors are shown to only take logophoric centres as their antecedent, Charnavel (2020) proposes that plain and exempt anaphors are in fact not separate entities with different restraints, but that instances of exempt anaphors are bound by a silent logophoric pronoun pro_{log} selected as the subject to a possible logophoric operator Op_{Log} and therefore satisfy Condition A.

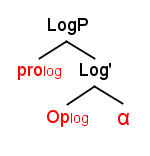
Adapted from Charnavel (2020), illustrating the structure of the LogP projection of the logophoric operator, where its complement 'α' contains the exempt anaphor which the silent logophoric pronoun binds. The LogP projection would appear in the left periphery of the exempt anaphors domain.

[La fille de Paul]_{i} explique que {[_{TP} pro_{log-i}} l’étrange journal de [sa_{i} propre fille]_{k} rapporte {[[_{DP} pro_{log-k}} les ignobles remarques des médias sur elle_{k}-même]].
the daughter of Paul explains that {} {the strange} diary of her own daughter relates {} the horrible remarks of.the media on her-same
'[Paul's daughter]_{i} explains that [her_{i} own daughter]_{k}'s strange diary relates the media's horrible remarks about [herself]_{k}.’

The above example - with the posited silent logophoric pronouns pro_{log-i} and pro_{log-k} (referring to la fille de Paul and sa propre fille respectively) binding sa propre fille and elle-même respectively - demonstrates that the perspectival domains ([_{DP} _]) can be introduced within clauses ([_{TP} _]). Furthermore, perspectival expressions like étrange and ignoble can be relativized to different perspectival centres within such a clause, with the two mentioned adjectives being (at least) evaluated by Paul's daughter and granddaughter respectively.

== Semantic accounts ==
=== Sells' (1987) account ===
Peter Sells introduced a semantic account of logophoricity using Discourse Representation Structure (DRS) that was first developed by Hans Kamp in 1981. Sells argues that rather than languages having logophoricity, the antecedent linked to the logophor is linked to three primitive roles. The three roles that affect this context are three semantic roles: the source, the self and the pivot. Logophoricity would then consist of a logophoric pronoun linked to a NP that plays one of those three roles. It may be the case that all three roles are assigned to one NP, such as the subject of the main verb. The logophor would then be portraying speech, thoughts, attitudes or the point of view of the individual being reported.

| Thematic Role | Definition |
|---|---|
| The SOURCE | the speaker; the one who makes the report; the individual who is the intentional communicator |
| The SELF | the one whose "mind" is being reported' the individual whose perspective is being reported |
| The PIVOT | the one from whose point of view the report is being made; the individual who is the deictic center of the discourse (ie. the one from whose physical perspective of the report is being evaluated) |

Unlike normal anaphors which must be bound to its antecedent within its domain (Condition A of Chomsky's Binding Theory), this approach allows for the possibility of binding between an antecedent and a logophor within the same sentence or across sentences within a discourse. The environment where logophoricity occurs is as listed below:

Discourse Environments
| | Direct Speech | 3POV | Psych-verb | "Logophoric" verb |
|---|---|---|---|---|
| SOURCE | external | external | external | internal |
| SELF | external | external | internal | internal |
| PIVOT | external | internal | internal | internal |

- Direct speech would imply a normal setting.
- 3POV occurs when the 'pivot' role refers to an individual other than the speaker.
- Psych-verb (psychological verbs) describes a case when the speaker is the source rather than the internal protagonist and holds 'self' and 'pivot' roles.
- Logophoric verbs occurs when the speaker is identifying as an internal protagonist.

Using this table, Sells argues that there is hierarchy between the roles. For example, if the self is internal then so must the pivot be as well. The same goes for the self is the source is internal. Internal refers to someone within the sentence while external refers to someone outside of the sentence.

There are two main components of DRS:

1. set of (reference) markers
2. set of conditions regarding the reference markers

The predicates which correspond to these primitives are represented by Discourse Markers (DMs). In Sell's examples, he adds a marker S to indicate the external speaker. u stands for individuals while p stands for propositions. The inner box are the truth conditions of proposition p. He also imposes a condition that the DMs associated with a primitive predicate are able to be anaphorically related to other referents in the discourse.

An example of this can be seen in Japanese where the logophoric pronoun refers back to an internal subject in the sentence.

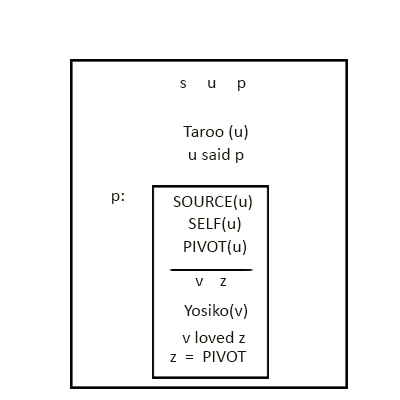
Sells' (1987) DRS for the Japanese sentence: 'Taroo_{i} said that Yosiko loved self_{i}.'

Tarooi wa Yoshiko ga zibuni o aisiteiru to-itta.
Taroo said that Yoshiko loved self

Since Taroo is the individual who is intentionally communicating the fact that Yosiko loved him (him being Taroo), he is the source. Taroo is also the self, as it is his perspective being reported. Finally, Taroo is the pivot too, for it is from his location that the content of the report is being evaluated.

In the DRS for Sentence 15: S stands for the external speaker, u stands for a predicate (in this example, Taroo), and p stands for a proposition. The inner box contains the content of the proposition, which is that Yosiko (a predicate of the embedded clause, marked with v) loved Taroo (which is another predicate, but marked with z). As can be inferred by the diagram, z is assigned the role of pivot, which corresponds to the NP Taroo.

=== Stirling's (1993) account ===
Following from Peter Sells' account, Stirling argued that there may not be a need for three primitive roles to explain logophoricity. In fact, logophoric phenomena can be explained by introducing only one semantic role into DRS: the assigned epistemic validator (or more briefly, validator). The role of validator is associated with the individual who is responsible for validating the content of what is being reported. This semantic role is assigned the DM v. Similarly to Sells, Stirling argues that once this primitive is within the bounds of a DRS, it is free to be anaphorically related to other NPs in the discourse.

Stirling specifies three possibilities for a speaker in reporting a proposition:

1. the speaker can assume the role of validator: v = i'
2. the speaker can dis-assign themselves from the role of validator: v ≠ i'
3. the speaker can reassign the role of validator to another individual: v = x

Here, i' is the DM used for the current speaker, and x is the DM associated with some other available NP in the discourse.

According to Stirling, in using just the role of validator, it is possible to generalize across cases which Sells argued necessitates the use of distinct primitives. For example, in contexts in which an individual's point of view is being reported, Sells posited the primitive of source; where a psychological state of an individual is being reported, Sells introduced the role of self. However, Sells argues that differentiating between these two contexts misses an important generalization: it is due to certain lexical properties that logophoric pronouns may be used in both contexts. More specifically, where an NP is a logophoric antecedent, it is typically the subject of a communicative verb in the matrix clause, while the logophoric pronoun occurs in a subordinate clause.

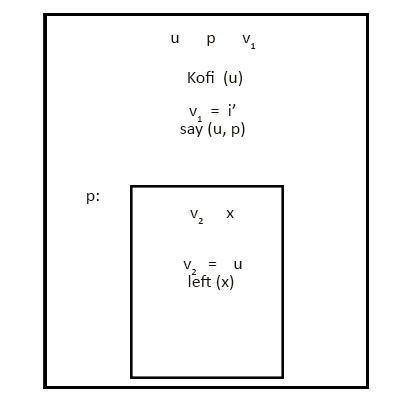
Stirling's (1993) DRS for the Ewe sentences: 'Kofi_{i} said that {he_{i}, s/he_{j}} left.'

This account can be used to explain the following examples from Ewe:

Kofi be yè-dzo
Kofi say LOG-leave
'Kofi_{i} said that he_{i} left.'

Kofi be e-dzo
Kofi say PRO-leave
'Kofi_{i} said that s/he_{j} left.'

The above examples are identical save for the logophoric pronoun yè appearing in the top example and the normal pronoun e appearing in the bottom example.

A DRS representing these sentences follows:

In the DRS For the Ewe sentences, each box represents a separate proposition, and the content of each is understood to have a distinct validator (v_{1} and v_{2}). For the logophoric sentence, in order to indicate the anaphoric relation between the subject of the matrix sentence (the logophoric antecedent) and the logophoric pronoun, we would need to specify that x = v_{2} (v_{2} and x refer to the same referential assignment) In order to interpret the DRS as per the logophoric sentence, we do not need to impose such a condition, as x need not co-refer to this antecedent in the discourse.

== See also ==
- Anaphora (linguistics) – Use of an expression whose interpretation depends on context
- Antecedent (grammar) – Expression that gives its meaning to a pro-form in grammar
- Binding (linguistics) – Distribution of anaphoric elements
- Bound variable pronoun – Construct in English grammar
- Coreference – Two or more expressions in a text with the same referent
- Discourse representation theory – Framework for exploring meaning
- Egophoricity – Linguistic encoding of personal knowledge
- Government and binding theory – Theory of syntax
- Logical form (linguistics) – Variant of a linguistic expression
- Obviative – Distinction between third person pronouns
- Reflexive pronoun – Anaphoric pronoun
- Subjunctive mood – Irrealis grammatical mood
- Switch-reference – Concept in linguistics
