= R-expression =

Concept in generative grammar

In Noam Chomsky's government and binding theory in linguistics, an R-expression (short for "referring expression" (the linked article explains the different, broader usage in other theories of linguistics) or "referential expression") is a noun phrase that refers to a specific real or imaginary entity. In contrast with anaphors and pronouns/pronominals, R-expressions obey condition C, which states that they are free, not bound to any other element. R-expressions include determiner phrases that are definite, and names.

== Bibliography ==
Crystal, David (6 June 2008). "R-expression". A Dictionary of Linguistics and Phonetics (1 ed.). Wiley. p. 416. doi:10.1002/9781444302776.ch18. ISBN 978-1-4051-5296-9.

DeArmond, Richard C. (7 January 2004). "Chapter 4: Binding Theory" (PDF). L322 (Linguistics 322) Syntax. Simon Fraser University. Archived (PDF) from the original on 29 July 2018.

Gluckman, John (26 July 2022) [first published 17 May 2020]. "Chapter 9: Binding theory". The Science of Syntax. Pressbooks. Archived from the original on 27 August 2024.

Hagstrom, Paul (26 September 2005). "Episode 4a. Binding Theory, NPIs, c-command, ditransitives, and little v; 4.3-4.4" (PDF). CAS LX 522: Syntax I. Boston University (published 16 June 2021). Archived (PDF) from the original on 26 September 2024.

Jackson, Eric Maurice (27 May 2023). "What is an R-expression, and how is it different from a pronoun?". Unit 2: Constituency and structure. OpenClass. Archived from the original on 26 September 2024.

Kerstens, Johan; Ruys, Eddy; Zwarts, Joost, eds. (1996–2001). "R-expression". Lexicon of Linguistics. Utrecht Institute of Linguistics (OTS), Utrecht University. Archived from the original on 29 January 2023.

Trask, R. L. (15 April 2013). "R-expression". A Dictionary of Grammatical Terms in Linguistics. Routledge. pp. 241–242. ISBN 978-1-134-88420-9.
