= Supercombinator =

Bound and self-contained mathematical expression

A supercombinator is a mathematical expression which is fully bound and self-contained. It may be either a constant or a combinator where all the subexpressions are supercombinators. Supercombinators are used in the implementation of functional languages.

In mathematical terms, a lambda expression S is a supercombinator of arity n if it has no free variables and is of the form λx_{1}.λx_{2}...λx_{n}.E (with n ≥ 0, so that lambdas are not required) such that E itself is not a lambda abstraction and any lambda abstraction in E is again a supercombinator.

== See also ==
- Lambda lifting
