= Pronouns in Colognian =

In the Colognian dialects, pronouns come in several variations. There are demonstrative pronouns, relative pronouns stressed and unstressed definite personal pronouns, indefinite personal pronouns, generalizing personal pronouns, impersonal pronouns, interrogative pronouns, possessive pronouns, …

== Pronoun use and semantics ==
Colognian demonstrative pronouns are used in sentences in positions where a noun phrase led by stressed or demonstrative article could be used as well. The pronoun 'replaces' it for brevity. In fact, a demonstrative pronoun can formally be seen as a noun phrase with the article retained and anything else spared, because grammar forms of demonstrative pronouns and those of demonstrative articles exhibit no differences. Demonstrative pronouns are either strict anaphora, or can be cataphora being resolved within the same or next sentence or subsentence. The use as exophora is possible and reduces the choice of intonation and stress patterns to exactly one, most commonly supported by appropriate gestures.

- Example of cataphoric use: Es dat Ding Auto? (Is this your car? , Is that your car?)
- Example of anaphoric use: Dää kütt noch! (Even though not yet here, he will come!)

There are personal pronouns for a variety of uses in Colognian. They all have in common that they link declension with an aspect of conjugation with their forms. Colognian declension follows a case, gender, number scheme, whereas declension among others has a person and number scheme with three grammatical persons: the 1st person referring to the speaker or speakers as agents or patients of a sentence, the 2nd person addresses the listener or listeners of the speaker or speakers as agents or patients of a sentence, while the 3rd person refers to something or someone else but the speaker(s) or the listener(s) as the agents or patients of a sentence, and two grammatical numbers, singular and plural. Declensed forms of personal pronouns combine these schemes. Most possessive pronouns have two distinct uses, some have three or four.

1. A possessive pronoun can replace an article, that is why Colognian possessive pronouns can also de called possessive articles.
  - Example: et Auto → ding Auto (the car → your car)
2. Like a demonstrative pronoun, a possessive pronoun can stand alone representing an entire noun phrase. It can be used exophoric or strict anaphoric, a cataphoric use must be resolved within the same or next sentence or sub-sentence.
  - Example: minge kanns de han (you can have mine)
3. One of the Cologinan genitives, namely the form having to precede its referent, can also be described as a possessive expression having the form: article-dative + noun-dative + possessive-pronoun-3rd person-nominative
  - Example: em Pap singe Poste (fathers post or position)

…

== Pronoun declensions ==
Demonstrative pronouns	singular masculine	singular feminine	singular neuter	plural any gender
Nominative:	dä	die	dat	die
Genitive:	dämm sing(e) dämm sie	dä iehr(e)	dämm sing(e) dämm sie	dänne iehr(e)
Genitive:	vun dämm	vun dää	vun dämm	vun dänne
Dative:	dämm	dää	dämm	dänne
Accusative:	dä	die	dat	die
Vocative:	—	—	—	—

Relative pronouns	singular masculine	singular feminine	singular neuter	plural any gender
Nominative:	dä	die	wat	die
Genitive:	dämm sing(e) dämm sie	dä iehr(e)	dämm sing(e) dämm sie	dänne iehr(e)
Genitive:	vun dämm	vun dää	vun dämm	vun dänne
Dative:	dämm	dää	dämm	dänne
Accusative:	dä	die	wat	die
Vocative:	dä	die	wat	die

Stressed definite personal pronouns	1st person singular any gender	2nd person singular any gender	3rd person singular masculine	3rd person singular feminine	3rd person singular neuter	1st person plural any gender	2nd person plural any gender	3rd person plural any gender
Nominative:	isch	do	hä	sei	it	mier	Ühr	sei
Genitive:	ming(e) mie	Ding(e); Die	sing(e) sie	iehr(e)	sing(e) sie	onser uns	Ühr	iehr(e)
Genitive:	vun mier	vun dier	vun imm	vun ehr	vun im	vun uns	vun Üsch	vun inne
Dative:	mier	dier	imm	ehr	im	uns	Üsch	inne
Accusative:	misch	Disch	inn	sei	it	uns	Üsch	sei
Vocative:	isch	Do	—	—	—	mier	Ühr	—

Unstressed definite personal pronouns	1st person singular any gender	2nd person singular any gender	3rd person singular masculine	3rd person singular feminine	3rd person singular neuter	1st person plural any gender	2nd person plural any gender	3rd person plural any gender
Nominative:	esch	de	e	se	et	mer	er	se
Genitive:	ming(e) mi	ding(e) di	sing(e) si	iehr(e)	sing(e) si	onser(e) ons	öhr(e)	iehr(e)
Genitive:	vun mer vummer	vun der	vun em	vun er	vun em	vun ons	vun üsch	vun enne
Dative:	mer	der	em	er	em	ons	üsch	enne
Accusative:	mesch	desch	en	se	et	ons	üsch	se
Vocative:	—	—	—	—	—	—	—	—

Indefinite personal pronouns	3rd person singular male	3rd person singular female	3rd person singular neuter	3rd person plural any gender
Nominative:	eine wä	ein wä	ein wä	wälsche
Genitive:	einem sing(e) wäm sing(e)	einem sing(e) wäm sing(e)	einem sing(e) wäm sing(e)	wälsche iehr(e)
Genitive:	vun einem vun wäm	vun einem vun wäm	vun einem vun wäm	vun wälsche
Dative:	einem wäm	einem wäm	einem wäm	wälsche
Accusative:	eine wä	ein wä	ein wä	wälsche
Vocative:	—	—	—	—

Generalizing personal pronouns	singular	plural
Nominative:	mer	mer
Genitive:	einem sing(e)	wälsche ier
Genitive:	vun einem	vun wälsche
Dative:	einem	wälsche
Accusative:	eine	wälsche
Vocative:	Do	Ühr

Impersonal pronouns	3rd person any number any gender
Nominative:	keine
Genitive:	keinem sing(e)
Genitive:	vun keinem
Dative:	keinem
Accusative:	keine
Vocative:	—

Interrogative pronouns	a person any number male	a person any number female	a person any number neuter	not a person any number any gender
Nominative:	wä	wä	wä	wat
Genitive:	wäm sing(e)	wä ier(e)	wäm sing(e)	wäm sing(e)
Genitive:	vun wäm	vun wä	vun wäm	vun wat
Dative:	wäm	wä	wäm	wat
Accusative:	wän	wän	wän	wat
Vocative:	—	—	—	—

Possessive pronouns			1st person singular any gender	2nd person singular any gender	3rd person singular masculine	3rd person singular feminine	3rd person singular neuter	1st person plural any gender	2nd person plural any gender	3rd person plural any gender
s i n g u l a r	m a s c u l i n e	Nominative:	minge ~ mi ~	dinge ~ di ~	singe ~ si ~	ehre ~	singe ~ si ~	unse ~ ons ~	üüre ~	eere ~
s i n g u l a r	m a s c u l i n e	Genitive:	mingem ~ sing(e)	dingem~ sing(e)	singem ~ sing(e)	eerem ~ sing(e)	singem ~ sing(e)	onsem ~ sing(e)	üürem ~ sing(e)	eerem ~ sing(e)
s i n g u l a r	m a s c u l i n e	Genitive:	vun mingem ~	vun dingem ~	vun singem ~	vun eerem ~	vun singem ~	vun onsem ~	vun ührem ~	vun eerem ~
s i n g u l a r	m a s c u l i n e	Dative:	mingem ~	dingem ~	singem ~	ehrem ~	singem ~	onsem ~	ührem ~	ehrem ~
s i n g u l a r	m a s c u l i n e	Accusative:	minge ~ mi ~	dinge ~ di ~	singe ~ si ~	ehre ~	singe ~ si ~	unse ~ ons ~	üüre ~	eere ~
s i n g u l a r	m a s c u l i n e	Vocative:	minge ~ mi ~	dinge ~ di ~	singe ~ si ~	ehre ~	singe ~ si ~	unse ~ ons ~	üüre ~	eere ~
s i n g u l a r	f e m i n i n e	Nominative:	ming ~ mi ~	ding ~ di ~	sing ~ si ~	eer ~	sing ~ si ~	uns ~ ons ~	üür ~	eer ~
s i n g u l a r	f e m i n i n e	Genitive:	minger ~ iehr(e)	dinger~ iehr(e)	singer ~ iehr(e)	eerer ~ iehr(e)	singer ~ iehr(e)	onser ~ iehr(e)	üürer ~ iehr(e)	eerer ~ iehr(e)
s i n g u l a r	f e m i n i n e	Genitive:	vun minger ~	vun dinger ~	vun singer ~	vun erer ~	vun singer ~	vun onser ~	vun ührer ~	vun erer ~
s i n g u l a r	f e m i n i n e	Dative:	minger ~	dinger ~	singer ~	ehrer ~	singer ~	onser ~	ührer ~	ehrer ~
s i n g u l a r	f e m i n i n e	Accusative:	ming ~ mi ~	ding ~ di ~	sing ~ si ~	eer ~	sing ~ si ~	uns ~ ons ~	üür ~	eer ~
s i n g u l a r	f e m i n i n e	Vocative:	ming ~ mi ~	ding ~ di ~	sing ~ si ~	eer ~	sing ~ si ~	uns ~ ons ~	üür ~	eer ~
s i n g u l a r	n e u t e r	Nominative:	ming ~ mi ~	ding ~ di ~	sing ~ si ~	eer ~	sing ~ si ~	uns ~ ons ~	üür ~	eer ~
s i n g u l a r	n e u t e r	Genitive:	mingem ~ sing(e)	dingem~ sing(e)	singem ~ sing(e)	eerem ~ sing(e)	singem ~ sing(e)	onsem ~ sing(e)	üürem ~ sing(e)	eerem ~ sing(e)
s i n g u l a r	n e u t e r	Genitive:	vun mingem ~	vun dingem ~	vun singem ~	vun eerem ~	vun singem ~	vun onsem ~	vun ührem ~	vun eerem ~
s i n g u l a r	n e u t e r	Dative:	mingem ~	dingem ~	singem ~	ehrem ~	singem ~	onsem ~	ührem ~	ehrem ~
s i n g u l a r	n e u t e r	Accusative:	ming ~ mi ~	ding ~ di ~	sing ~ si ~	eer ~	sing ~ si ~	uns ~ ons ~	üür ~	eer ~
s i n g u l a r	n e u t e r	Vocative:	ming ~ mi ~	ding ~ di ~	sing ~ si ~	eer ~	sing ~ si ~	uns ~ ons ~	üür ~	eer ~
p l u r a l	a n y g e n d e r	Nominative:	ming ~ mi ~	ding ~ di ~	sing ~ si ~	eer ~	sing ~ si ~	uns ~ ons ~	üür ~	eer ~
p l u r a l	a n y g e n d e r	Genitive:	minge ~ iehr(e)	dinge~ iehr(e)	singe ~ iehr(e)	eere ~ iehr(e)	singe ~ iehr(e)	onser ~ iehr(e) onse ~ iehr(e) ons ~ iehr(e)	üüre ~ iehr(e)	eere ~ iehr(e)
p l u r a l	a n y g e n d e r	Genitive:	vun minge ~	vun dinge ~	vun singe ~	vun ere ~	vun singe ~	vun onser ~ vun onse ~ vun ons ~	vun ühre ~	vun ere ~
p l u r a l	a n y g e n d e r	Dative:	minge ~	dingr ~	singe ~	ehre ~	singe ~	onser ~ onse ~ ons ~	ühre ~	ehre ~
p l u r a l	a n y g e n d e r	Accusative:	ming ~ mi ~	ding ~ di ~	sing ~ si ~	eer ~	sing ~ si ~	uns ~ ons ~	üür ~	eer ~
p l u r a l	a n y g e n d e r	Vocative:	ming ~	ding ~ di ~	sing ~ si ~	eer ~	sing ~ si ~	uns ~ ons ~	üür ~	eer ~

== Bibliography ==
- Ferdinand Münch: Grammatik der ripuarisch-fränkischen Mundart. Cohen, Bonn 1904. (online)
  Reprinted with permission: Saendig Reprint Verlag, Wiesbaden 1970, ISBN 3-500-21670-6, under a license by Verlag Bouvier, Bonn.
- Fritz Hoenig: Wörterbuch der Kölner Mundart. second, extended edition, Cologne 1905.
- Alice Tiling-Herrwegen: De kölsche Sproch, Kurzgrammatik Kölsch-Deutsch. Bachem-Verlag Köln. 1st edition, 2002. ISBN 3-7616-1604-X
- Christa Bhatt, Alice Herrwegen: Das Kölsche Wörterbuch. Bachem-Verlag Köln. 2nd edition, 2005. ISBN 3-7616-1942-1
