= Cohesion (linguistics) =

Grammatical and lexical linking in text

Cohesion is the grammatical and lexical linking within a text or sentence that holds a text together and gives it meaning. It is related to the broader concept of coherence.

There are two main types of cohesion:

- grammatical cohesion: based on structural content
- lexical cohesion: based on lexical content and background knowledge.

A cohesive text is created in many different ways. In Cohesion in English, M.A.K. Halliday and Ruqaiya Hasan identify five general categories of cohesive devices that create coherence in texts: reference, ellipsis, substitution, lexical cohesion and conjunction.

== Referencing ==
There are two referential devices that can create cohesion:

- Anaphoric reference occurs when the writer refers back to someone or something that has been previously identified, to avoid repetition. Some examples: replacing "the taxi driver" with the pronoun "he" or "two girls" with "they". Another example can be found in formulaic sequences such as "as stated previously" or "the aforementioned".
- Cataphoric reference is the opposite of anaphora: a reference forward as opposed to backward in the discourse. Something is introduced in the abstract before it is identified. For example: "Here he comes, our award-winning host... it's John Doe!" Cataphoric references can also be found in written text.

There is one more referential device, which cannot create cohesion:

- Exophoric reference is used to describe generics or abstracts without ever identifying them (in contrast to anaphora and cataphora, which do identify the entity and thus are forms of endophora): e.g. rather than introduce a concept, the writer refers to it by a generic word such as "everything". The prefix "exo" means "outside", and the persons or events referred to in this manner are never identified by the writer. Halliday and Hasan considered exophoric reference as not cohesive, since it does not tie two elements together into in text.

A homophoric reference is a generic phrase that obtains a specific meaning through knowledge of its context. For example, the meaning of the phrase "the Queen" may be determined by the country in which it is spoken.

== Ellipsis ==
Ellipsis is another cohesive device. It happens when, after a more specific mention, words are omitted when the phrase must be repeated.

A simple conversational example:

- A: Where are you going?
- B: To dance.

The full form of B's reply would be: "I am going to dance".

A simple written example: The younger child was very outgoing, the older much more reserved.

The omitted words from the second clause are "child" and "was".

== Substitution ==
A word is not omitted, as in ellipsis, but is substituted for another, more general word. For example, "Which ice-cream would you like?" – "I would like the pink one," where "one" is used instead of repeating "ice-cream."

== Lexical Cohesion ==
Lexical cohesion refers to the way related words are chosen to link elements of a text. There are two forms: repetition and collocation. Repetition uses the same word, or synonyms, antonyms, etc. For example, "Which dress are you going to wear?" – "I will wear my green frock," uses the synonyms "dress" and "frock" for lexical cohesion. Collocation uses related words that typically go together or tend to repeat the same meaning. An example is the phrase "once upon a time".

== See also ==
- Coherence (linguistics)
- M.A.K. Halliday
- Systemic functional linguistics

== Sources ==
- Halliday, M.A.K; and Ruqayia Hasan (1976): Cohesion in English. London: Longman.
- Hoey, Michael (1991): Patterns of Lexis in Text. Oxford: OUP.
- Kunz, K. & Steiner, E. Towards a comparison of cohesion in English and German — concepts, systemic contrasts and a corpus architecture for investigating contrasts and contact, in: Taboada, Maite, Suárez, Susana Doval and González Álvarez, Elsa. Forthcoming. Contrastive Discourse Analysis. Functional and Corpus Perspectives. London: Equinox.
