= Coherence (linguistics) =

What makes a text semantically meaningful

Coherence in linguistics is what makes a text semantically meaningful. It is especially dealt with in text linguistics. Coherence is achieved through syntactic features such as the use of deictic, anaphoric and cataphoric elements or a logical tense structure, and semantic features such as presuppositions and implications connected to general world knowledge.

Robert De Beaugrande and Wolfgang U. Dressler define coherence as a "continuity of senses" and "the mutual access and relevance within a configuration of concepts and relations". Thereby a textual world is created that does not have to comply to the real world. But within this textual world the arguments also have to be connected logically so that the reader/hearer can produce coherence.

"Continuity of senses" implies a link between cohesion and the theory of Schemata initially proposed by F. C. Bartlett in 1932 which creates further implications for the notion of a "text". Schemata, subsequently distinguished into Formal and Content Schemata (in the field of TESOL) are the ways in which the world is organized in our minds. In other words, they are mental frameworks for the organization of information about the world. It can thus be assumed that a text is not always one because the existence of coherence is not always a given. On the contrary, coherence is relevant because of its dependence upon each individual's content and formal schemata.

== See also ==
- M.A.K. Halliday
- Semantic prosody
- Systemic functional linguistics
- Coh-Metrix

== Sources ==
- Bußmann, Hadumod: Lexikon der Sprachwissenschaft. Stuttgart, 1983. S. 537.
