= Mauve (disambiguation) =

Mauve is a color.

Mauve may also refer to:

- Perkin's mauve, a dye
- Mauve (test suite), for software
- MAUVE (metric), a measure of distributional similarity between machine-generated and human-written text
- Mauve (album), by Ringo Deathstarr
- Anton Mauve, a painter
- Mauve (Fabergé egg)
