= Correlative =

Grammatical word pairing

In grammar, a correlative is a word that is paired with another word with which it functions to perform a single function but from which it is separated in the sentence.

In English, examples of correlative pairs are both–and, either–or, neither–nor, the–the ("the more the better"), so–that ("it ate so much food that it burst"), and if–then.

In the Romance languages, the demonstrative pro-forms function as correlatives with the relative pro-forms, as autant–que in French; in English, demonstratives are not used in such constructions, which depend on the relative only: "I saw what you did", rather than *"I saw that, what you did".

== See also ==
- Correlative conjunction
- Pro-form (namely section Table of correlatives)
