= Nearest referent =

Grammatical term used to disambiguate

The nearest referent is a grammatical term sometimes used when two or more possible referents of a pronoun, or other part of speech, cause ambiguity in a text. However "nearness", proximity, may not be the most meaningful criterion for a decision, particularly where word order, inflection and other aspects of syntax are more relevant.

The concept of nearest referent is found in analysis of various languages, including classical languages Greek, Latin and Arabic. It may create or resolve variant views in interpretation of a text.

There are other models than nearest referent for deciding what a pronoun, or other part of speech, refers to, and reference order distinguishes pronoun-referent structures where:

- the pronoun follows its antecedent (Forward Reference, FW)
- the pronoun precedes its referent (Backward Reference, BW)

This is also described as anaphoric reference (anaphor, previous referent) and cataphoric reference (cataphor, following referent).
