= Exophora =

Reference to something not in the immediate text

In linguistic pragmatics, exophora is a verbal reference to something extratextual, i.e. not found elsewhere in the (written or spoken) text. It contrasts with endophora. Exophora can be deictic, in which special words or grammatical markings are used to make reference to something in the context of the utterance or speaker. For example, pronouns are often exophoric, with words such as "this", "that", "here", "there", as in that chair over there is John's said while indicating the direction of the chair referred to. Given "Did the gardener water those plants?", it is quite possible that "those" refers back to the preceding text, to some earlier mention of those particular plants in the discussion. But it is also possible that it refers to the environment in which the dialogue is taking place—to the "context of situation", as it is called—where the plants in question are present and can be pointed to if necessary. The interpretation would be "those plants there, in front of us". This kind of reference is called exophora, since it takes us outside the text altogether. Exophoric reference is not cohesive, since it does not bind the two elements together into a text.

== Homophora ==
A type of exophora, homophora relates to a generic phrase that obtains a specific meaning through knowledge of its context; a specific example of homophora can variably be a "homophor" or a "homophoric reference".

For example, the meaning of the phrase "the Queen" may be determined by the country in which it is spoken. Because there are many Queens throughout the world, the location of the speaker provides the extra information that allows an individual Queen to be identified.

The precise origin of the term is not fully clear, but it is probably intended to suggest a referring expression that always has the same (Greek hómos) referent (within a given cultural context, of course). "Homophoric" seems to have been first used in the influential book by M.A.K. Halliday and R. Hasan, Cohesion in English (Longman, 1976, pp. 71 and 73).

== See also ==
- Anaphora – Use of an expression whose interpretation depends on context
- Cataphoric reference – Use of an expression or word that co-refers with a later, more specific, expression
- Generic antecedent – Representatives of classes in a situation in which gender is typically unknown
