= Louise Ravelli =

Australia linguist

- Born: 29 July 1963 (age 63)

Academic background
- Education: University of Sydney (BA); University of Birmingham (MPhil, PhD)
- Doctoral advisor: Michael Hoey

Academic work
- Discipline: Linguist
- Sub-discipline: Discourse analysis; Systemic functional grammar; Multimodal communication
- Institutions: University of New South Wales

Louise Jane Ravelli (born 29 July 1963) is an Australian linguist. She is a professor in the School of the Arts and Media at the University of New South Wales, Australia. Her research expertise includes multimodal communication, museum communication, discourse analysis, and systemic functional grammar, using the frameworks of Systemic Functional Linguistics, Social Semiotics, and Multimodal Discourse Analysis.

Ravelli has authored a number of books in linguistics, multimodality, and museum studies, including Multimodality in the Built Environment: Spatial Discourse Analysis (with Robert McMurtrie, 2016), Doctoral Writing in the Creative and Performing Arts (with Brian Paltridge and Sue Starfield, 2014), and Museum Texts: Communication Frameworks (2006).

== Biography ==
Ravelli grew up and attended school in Parkes, New South Wales.

Ravelli completed a Bachelor of Arts with Honours in Linguistics at the University of Sydney, Australia in 1985, followed by a Master of Philosophy in 1987 at the University of Birmingham, United Kingdom. In 1991 she completed her PhD, also at the University of Birmingham, supervised by Michael Hoey. She then held a position at the University of Wollongong, Australia for six years, before moving to the University of New South Wales (UNSW). At UNSW, Ravelli initially worked in the Department of Linguistics, before moving to the Department of Media in 2007.

Ravelli has worked as a communications consultant to the Australian Museum and the Museum of Contemporary Art Australia. Ravelli also wrote a book of language guidelines for museum exhibitions, published by the Australian museum in 1995 (Meanings and messages: Language guidelines for museum exhibitions, with Linda Ferguson and Carolyn MacLulich).

Ravelli serves as an editor for the journal Visual Communication.

== Contributions to linguistics ==
Ravelli has contributed to academic writing, museum communication, and multimodality, especially spatial discourse analysis. She also contributed to early research on grammatical metaphor, for example her 1988 book chapter, Grammatical metaphor: An initial analysis in the book Pragmatics, Discourse and Text: Some systemically-inspired approaches.

Her work on academic writing includes research conducted as part of an Australian Research Council Discovery Project Grant titled Writing in the Academy: The practice-based thesis as an evolving genre (2008-2012, with Brian Paltridge and Sue Starfield).

== Awards and distinctions ==
- University of Birmingham/Collins COBUILD Scholarship for Postgraduate Research (1986–1987)

== Key publications ==
1. Ravelli, L. (2006). Museum Texts: Communication Frameworks. London and New York: Routledge.
2. Ravelli, L. (1988). Grammatical metaphor: an initial analysis, in E. Steiner; R. Veltman R (Eds). Pragmatics, Discourse and Text: Some systemically-inspired approaches, London: Pinter, pp. 133 – 147.
3. VandenBergen, A; Taverniers, M; Ravelli, L. (Eds). (2003). Grammatical metaphor: views from systemic functional linguistics. Amsterdam: Benjamins.
4. Ravelli, L. (1999). Getting started with functional analysis of texts, in L. Unsworth (Ed). Researching language in schools and communities. London: Cassell, pp. 27–64.
5. Ravelli, L. (2003). Renewal of connection: integrating theory and practice in an understanding of grammatical metaphor. In AM Simon-Vandenbergen, M. Taverniers, and L. Ravelli (Eds) Grammatical metaphor: views from systemic functional linguistics. Amsterdam: Benjamins, pp. 37–64.
