= Text linguistics =

Branch of Linguistics

Text linguistics is a branch of linguistics that deals with texts as communication systems. Its original aims lay in uncovering and describing text grammars. The application of text linguistics has, however, evolved from this approach to a point in which text is viewed in much broader terms that go beyond a mere extension of traditional grammar towards an entire text. Text linguistics takes into account the form of a text, but also its setting, i. e. the way in which it is situated in an interactional, communicative context. Both the author of a (written or spoken) text as well as its addressee are taken into consideration in their respective (social and/or institutional) roles in the specific communicative context. In general it is an application of discourse analysis at the much broader level of text, rather than just a sentence or word.

== Overview ==
=== Definitions ===
"A text is an extended structure of syntactic units [i. e. text as super-sentence] such as words, groups, and clauses and textual units that is marked by both coherence among the elements and completion ... [Whereas] a non-text consists of random sequences of linguistic units such as sentences, paragraphs, or sections in any temporal and/or spatial extension." (Werlich, 1976: 23)

"A naturally occurring manifestation of language, i. e. as a communicative language event in a context. The surface text is the set of expressions actually used; these expressions make some knowledge explicit, while other knowledge remains implicit, though still applied during processing." (Beaugrande and Dressler, 1981: 63)

"[A term] used in linguistics to refer to any passage- spoken or written, of whatever length, that does form a unified whole [….] A text is a unit of language in use. It is not a grammatical unit, like a clause or a sentence; and it is not defined by its size [….] A text is best regarded as a semantic unit; a unit not of form but of meaning." (Halliday and Hasan, 1976: 1–2)

"A text is made up of sentences, but there exist separate principles of text-construction, beyond the rules for making sentences." (Fowler, 1991: 59)

"[Text is] a set of mutually relevant communicative functions, structured in such a way as to achieve an overall rhetorical purpose." (Hatim and Mason, 1990)

Text linguists generally agree that text is the natural domain of language, but they still differ in their perspectives of what constitutes a text. This variance is mainly due to the different methods of observation of different linguists, and as such, the definition of text is not yet concrete.

=== Reasons for text linguistics ===
Traditional linguistic analysis has often focused on the sentence as a self-contained unit, whereas text linguistics emphasizes how sentences function within larger, connected stretches of language. It approaches language as sequences of sentences that together create cohesive and coherent discourse.

Text is extremely significant in communication because people communicate not by means of individual words or fragments of sentences in languages, but by means of texts. It is also the basis of various disciplines such as law, religion, medicine, science, and politics.

== Contexts ==
=== Significance of contexts ===
There is a text and there is other text that accompanies it: text that is 'with', namely the con-text. This notion of what is 'with the text', however, goes beyond what is said and written: it includes other non-verbal signs-on-the total environment in which a text unfolds. (Halliday and Hasan, 1985: 5)

According to Halliday, text is a sign representation of a socio-cultural event embedded in a context of situation. Context of situation is the semio-socio-cultural environment in which the text unfolds. Text and context are so intimately related that neither concept can be comprehended in the absence of the other.

==== Three features of context of situation ====
- The field of discourse – experiential meaning

This is the meaning that the social actions and the engagements of the participants are giving to the understanding of the text.

- The tenor of discourse – interpersonal meaning

This is the meaning that the roles of and relationships among participants give to the understanding of the text. These relationships may be permanent or temporary. The contribution to meaning by social statuses of the participants also fall within this feature.

- The mode of discourse – logical meaning

This is the meaning that the language, written or spoken, gives to the understanding of the text. This includes the symbolic organization of the text, as well as its intended function within the context.

=== Texture ===
Texture is the basis for unity and semantic interdependence within text. Any text that lacks texture would simply be a bunch of isolated sentences that have no relationship to each other. (Crane, 1994) A feature of texture is "sequential implicativeness", as suggested by Schegloff and Sacks (1974). This refers to the property of language that each line in a text is linked from or linked to the previous line. As such, language contains a linear sequence, and this linear progression of text creates a context of meaning. This contextual meaning, at the paragraph level, is referred to as "coherence", while the internal properties of meaning are referred to as "cohesion". (Eggins, 1994: 85) There are two aspects of coherence, namely, "situational" coherence and "generic" coherence. There is situational coherence when field, tenor, and mode can be identified for a certain group of clauses. On the other hand, there is generic coherence when the text can be recognized as belonging to a certain genre. Thereby, cohesion is the result of "semantic ties", which refers to the dependent links between items within a text. These ties come together to create meaning. Texture is, therefore, created within text when the properties of coherence and cohesion are present.

=== Text types ===
Most linguists agree on the classification into five text-types: narrative, descriptive, argumentative, instructive, and comparison/contrast (also called expositive). Some classifications divide the types of texts according to their function. Others differ because they take into consideration the topic of the texts, the producer and the addressee, or the style. Adam and Petitjean, (1989) proposed analyzing of overlaps of different text types with text sequences. Virtanen (1992) establishes a double classification (discourse type and text type) to be used when the Identification text-text type is not straightforward.

== Structure ==
As a science of text, text linguistics describes or explains among different types of text the:

- Shared features
- Distinct features

Text linguistics is the study of how texts function in human interaction. Beaugrande and Dressler define a text as a “communicative occurrence which meets seven standards of textuality” – cohesion, coherence, intentionality, acceptability, informativity, situationality and intertextuality, without any of which the text will not be communicative. Non-communicative texts are treated as non-texts.

=== Cohesion ===
Surface texts are the exact words that people see or hear. Cohesion concerns the ways in which the components of the surface text are connected within a sequence. Grammatical forms and conventions are adhered to by surface components and therefore cohesion rests upon grammatical dependencies. The grammatical dependencies in surface texts are major signals for sorting out meanings and uses. Cohesion encompasses all of the functions that can be used to signal relations among surface elements.

SLOW

CARS

HELD UP

Such a text can be divided up into various dependencies. Someone might construe it as a notice about "slow cars" that are "held up", so that conclusions could be drawn about the need to drive fast to avoid being held up. However, it is more likely for one to divide the text into "slow" and "cars held up', so that drivers will drive slowly to avoid accidents or take alternative routes to avoid being caught in the slow traffic. A science of text should explain how ambiguities such as these are possible, as well as how they are precluded or resolved without much difficulty. For efficient communication to take place there must be interaction between cohesion and other standards of textuality because the surface alone is not decisive.

=== Coherence ===
Coherence concerns the ways in which concepts, cognitive contents that can be retrieved or triggered with a high degree of consistency in the mind, and relations, the links between concepts within a text, with each link identified with the concept that it connects to, which underlie the surface text, are linked, relevant, and used to achieve efficient communication.

Surface texts may not always express relations explicitly therefore people supply as many relations as are needed to make sense out of any particular text. Types of relations include:

1. Causality

"Itsy Bitsy spider climbing up the spout. Down came the rain and washed the spider out."

The event of "raining" causes the event of "washing the spider out" because it creates the necessary conditions for the latter; without the rain, the spider will not be washed out.

2. Enablement

"Humpty Dumpty sat on the wall, Humpty Dumpty had a great fall."

The action of sitting on the wall created the necessary but not sufficient conditions for the action of falling down. Sitting on a wall makes it possible but not obligatory for falling down to occur.

3. Reason

"Jack shall have but a penny a day because he can't work any faster."

In contrast to the rain which causes Itsy Bitsy spider to be washed out, the slow working does not actually cause or enable the low wage. Instead, the low wage is a reasonable outcome; "reason" is used to term actions that occur as a rational response to a previous event.

4. Purpose

"Old Mother Hubbard went to the cupboard to get her poor dog a bone."

In contrast to Humpty Dumpty's action of sitting on the wall which enables the action of falling down, there is a plan involved here; Humpty Dumpty did not sit on the wall so that it could fall down but Old Mother Hubbard went to the cupboard so that she could get a bone. "Purpose" is used to term events that are planned to be made possible via a previous event.

5. Time

"Cause", "enablement" and "reason" have forward directionality with the earlier event causing, enabling or providing reason for the later event. "Purpose', however, has a backward directionality as the later event provides the purpose for the earlier event.

More than just a feature of texts, coherence is also the outcome of cognitive processes among text users. The nearness and proximity of events in a text will trigger operations which recover or create coherence relations.

"The Queen of Hearts, she made some tarts;
The Knave of Hearts, he stole the tarts;
The King of Hearts, called for the tarts."

In the explicit text, there is a set of actions (making, stealing and calling); the only relations presented are the agent and the affected entity of each action. However, a text receiver is likely to assume that the locations of all three events are close to one another as well as occur in a continuous and relatively short time frame. One might also assume that the actions are meant to signal the attributes of the agents; the Queen is skilled in cooking, the Knave is dishonest and the King is authoritative. As such, coherence encompasses inferencing based on one's knowledge.

For a text to make sense, there has to be interaction between one's accumulated knowledge and the text-presented knowledge. Therefore, a science of texts is probabilistic instead of deterministic, that is, inferences by users of any particular text will be similar most of the time instead of all of the time. Most text users have a common core of cognitive composition, engagement and process such that their interpretations of texts through "sensing" are similar to what text senders intend them to be. Without cohesion and coherence, communication would be slowed down and could break down altogether. Cohesion and coherence are text-centred notions, designating operations directed at the text materials.

=== Intentionality ===
Intentionality concerns the text producer's attitude and intentions as the text producer uses cohesion and coherence to attain a goal specified in a plan. Without cohesion and coherence, intended goals may not be achieved due to a breakdown of communication. However, depending on the conditions and situations in which the text is used, the goal may still be attained even when cohesion and coherence are not upheld.

"'Want I carry you on my back?'"

Even though cohesion is not maintained in this example, the text producer still succeeds in achieving the goal of finding out if the text receiver wanted a piggyback.

=== Acceptability ===
Acceptability concerns the text receiver's attitude that the text should constitute useful or relevant details or information worth accepting. Text type, the desirability of goals and the political and sociocultural setting, as well as cohesion and coherence, are important in influencing the acceptability of a text.

Text producers often speculate on the receiver's attitude of acceptability and present texts that maximize the probability that the receivers will respond as desired by the producers. For example, texts that are open to a wide range of interpretations, such as "Call us before you dig. You may not be able to afterwards" require more inferences about the related consequences. This is more effective than an explicit version of the message that informs receivers the full consequences of digging without calling, because receivers are left with great uncertainty as to the consequences that could result; this plays to people's risk aversion.

=== Informativity ===
Informativity concerns the extent to which the contents of a text are already known or expected as compared to unknown or unexpected. No matter how expected or predictable content may be, a text will always be informative at least to a certain degree due to unforeseen variability. The processing of highly informative text demands greater cognitive ability but at the same time is more interesting. The level of informativity should not exceed a point such that the text becomes too complicated and communication is endangered. Conversely, the level of informativity should also not be so low that it results in boredom and the rejection of the text.

=== Situationality ===
Situationality concerns the factors which make a text relevant to a situation of occurrence. The situation in which a text is exchanged influences the comprehension of the text. There may be different interpretations with the road sign

SLOW

CARS

HELD UP

However, the most likely interpretation of the text is obvious because the situation in which the text is presented provides the context which influences how text receivers interpret the text. The group of receivers (motorists) who are required to provide a particular action will find it more reasonable to assume that "slow" requires them to slow down rather than referring to the speed of the cars that are ahead. Pedestrians can tell easily that the text is not directed towards them because varying their speeds is inconsequential and irrelevant to the situation. In this way, the situation decides the sense and use of the text.

Situationality can affect the means of cohesion; less cohesive text may be more appropriate than more cohesive text depending on the situation. If the road sign was "Motorists should reduce their speed and proceed slowly because the vehicles ahead are held up by road works, therefore proceeding at too high a speed may result in an accident', every possible doubt of intended receivers and intention would be removed. However, motorists only have a very short amount of time and attention to focus on and react to road signs. Therefore, in such a case, economical use of text is much more effective and appropriate than a fully cohesive text.

=== Intertextuality ===
Intertextuality concerns the factors which make the utilization of one text dependent upon knowledge of one or more previously encountered text. If a text receiver does not have prior knowledge of a relevant text, communication may break down because the understanding of the current text is obscured. Texts such as parodies, rebuttals, forums and classes in school, the text producer has to refer to prior texts while the text receivers have to have knowledge of the prior texts for communication to be efficient or even occur. In other text types such as puns, for example "Time flies like an arrow; fruit flies like a banana', there is no need to refer to any other text.

== Main contributors ==
=== Robert-Alain de Beaugrande ===
Robert-Alain de Beaugrande was a text linguist and a discourse analyst, one of the leading figures of the Continental tradition in the discipline. He was one of the developers of the Vienna School of Textlinguistik (Department of Linguistics at the University of Vienna), and published the seminal Introduction to Text Linguistics in 1981, with Wolfgang U. Dressler. He was also a major figure in the consolidation of critical discourse analysis.

== Application to language learning ==
According to some scholars, the study of text linguistics can support reading and writing instruction by encouraging engagement with a variety of texts and by drawing attention to how different text structures and vocabularies function in context.

== See also ==
- Linguistics
- History of linguistics
- Text (literary theory)
