= WYSIWYM (interaction technique) =

What you see is what you meant (WYSIWYM) is a text editing interaction technique that emerged from two projects at University of Brighton. It allows users to create abstract knowledge representations such as those required by the Semantic Web using a natural language interface. Natural language understanding (NLU) technology is not employed. Instead, natural language generation (NLG) is used in a highly interactive manner.

The text editor accepts repeated refinement of a selected span of text as it becomes progressively less vacuous of authored semantics. Using a mouse, a text property held in the evolving text can be further refined by a set of options derived by NLG from a built-in ontology. An invisible representation of the semantic knowledge is created which can be used for multilingual document generation, formal knowledge formation, or any other task that requires formally specified information.

The two projects at Brighton worked in the field of Conceptual Authoring to lay a foundation for further research and development of a Semantic Web Authoring Tool (SWAT). This tool has been further explored as a means for developing a knowledge base by those without prior experience with Controlled Natural Language tools.

== See also ==
- Semantic markup
- OWL [Web Ontology Language]
- WYSIWYM
- Protégé (software)
