= Robert de Beaugrande =

Robert-Alain de Beaugrande (1946 – June 2008) was an American text linguist and discourse analyst, one of the leading figures of the Continental tradition in the discipline. He was one of the developers of the Vienna School of Textlinguistik (Department of Linguistics at the University of Vienna), and published the seminal Introduction to Text Linguistics in 1981, with Wolfgang U. Dressler. He was also a major figure in the consolidation of critical discourse analysis.

== Personal life ==
According to census records, de Beaugrande was born James L Shoemaker in Colorado in 1946. He was raised in Missoula, Montana, where his father Theodore was a professor at The University of Montana. His mother was Eunice J Hankey Shoemaker, and he had a sister, Ellen Shoemaker, who died in 2003, the same year as their mother.

At some point during his education after leaving Montana, he changed his name from James Shoemaker to Robert-Alain de Beaugrande and reportedly adopted a German accent. The exact timing and circumstances of this name change are not well documented, though it appears to have occurred during his academic career development.

== Academic career ==
De Beaugrande had an MA in German and English Language and Literature by the Free University of Berlin, in 1971, and a PhD in Comparative Literature and Linguistics by the University of California, Irvine, in 1976. He served as professor of English in the University of Florida from 1978 to 1991, of English Linguistics at the University of Vienna from 1991 to 1997, Professor of English Language at the University of Botswana in Gaborone, Professor of English and English Linguistics at the University of Florida at Gainesville, and later as visiting professor in several universities in Asia, the Middle East, and Latin America.

=== Academic positions ===
Throughout his career, de Beaugrande held professorial positions at numerous international institutions:

- University of Florida, Gainesville
- University of Vienna, Austria
- University of Botswana, Gaborone
- United Arab Emirates University, Al Ain
- Federal University of Paraíba, João Pessoa, Brazil
- University of Primorska, Koper, Slovenia

=== Teaching style and personality ===
De Beaugrande was known for his unconventional approach to academia and complex personality. According to former student Caspar van Helden, who studied under him at the University of Vienna in 1994, de Beaugrande "was certainly not the most easily approachable professor there, and his communication with students seemed a bit unpredictable."

However, according to van Helden, de Beaugrande's approach had underlying logic: he "tended to appreciate those who created complex questions, and never looked for easy answers. He scorned academic conventions, of which there were so very many in Vienna." His unconventional teaching methods included giving students exam questions weeks in advance along with their grades, which were consistently A's, reflecting his disregard for traditional academic assessment practices.

== Personal website and open access advocacy ==
De Beaugrande created a personal website as early as 2000 to provide access to his academic works. He explained that the site was necessary because many of his works were difficult to access through traditional academic channels for several reasons: recent works not yet submitted for publication or under lengthy review processes; publications in obscure sources such as in-house journals of universities or academies of science; unpublished works rejected due to what he characterized as "the byzantine, clannish tactics of academic reviewing and publishing"; and controversial works addressing "sacred cows in our profession, such as grades, peer review, external examiners, and the stratified organisation of international conferences."

By 2004, he had expanded the site into what he called a "free library," which garnered over 14,000 visits and downloads by September 2005. De Beaugrande expressed particular satisfaction that his works were reaching readers worldwide who "could not possibly buy them," making his academic contributions accessible to scholars in developing countries and regions with limited resources.

Under the motto "**FREEDOM TO THE BOOKS!!**", de Beaugrande advocated for open access to knowledge, stating that he could not "reach out by means of expensive or hard-to-find books." His website provided scanned, edited, and reformatted versions of his academic works, with individual webpages kept under 300 KB for accessibility.

For readers in areas with difficult or unsafe Internet access, he offered to send free CD versions of his complete works, formatted for efficient printing.

== Selected works ==
- Text, Discourse and Process: Toward a Multidisciplinary Science of Texts. Norwood, N.J.: Ablex, 1980
- Introduction to Text Linguistics (with Wolfgang Dressler). London: Longman, 1981.
- Text Production. Norwood, N.J.: Ablex, 1984
- Critical Discourse: A Survey of Contemporary Literary Theorists. Norwood, N.J.: Ablex, 1988
- New Foundations for a Science of Text and Discourse. Greenwich, CT: Ablex, 1997
- A New Introduction to the Study of Text and Discourse. Uploaded to personal website June 2004.
