= Michael Hoey (linguist) =

British linguist (1948–2021)

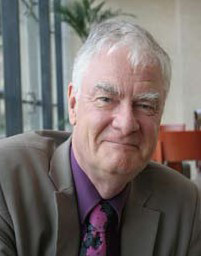
- Hoey in 2011
- Born: 24 February 1948; Preston, United Kingdom
- Died: 10 September 2021 (aged 73)
- Occupations: Author, academic
- Writing career
- Subject: Linguistics
- Notable works: Textual Interaction, On The Surface of Discourse, Lexical Priming: A New Theory of Words and Language, Patterns of Lexis in Text

Michael Hoey (24 February 1948 – 10 September 2021) was a British linguist and Baines Professor of English Language. He lectured in applied linguistics in over 40 countries.

== Early life ==
Michael Peter Hoey was born in Preston in 1948, the son of Charles Hoey, a chemical engineer, and his wife, Mary. He grew up in Hemel Hempstead, where the family had moved to when he was very young. He began studying Law at UCL but felt that the subject did not appeal to his interest in people and how they form identities. He soon realised that his real interests lay elsewhere, and transferred to a degree in English. His interest in the English language was stimulated by the tuition of the celebrated linguist Sir Randolph Quirk. He met Sue Ward, a fellow student, whom he married in 1971. They had two children, Alice and Richard.

== Professional life ==
Hoey's first teaching job was at Hatfield Polytechnic, where he started as Research Assistant in 1970, and was promoted to be senior lecturer in 1977, where he worked with Eugene Winter until both of them moved on to teach at Birmingham University in 1979. As Senior lecturer at Birmingham, he co-authored (with Sue Atkins) under the direction of Professor John Sinclair the proposal that led to the development of the Collins CoBUILD (an acronym for Collins Birmingham University International Language Database), the first-ever corpus-driven dictionary. "Without realising it," Hoey relates, "I was slowly mutating into a corpus linguist."

Hoey was appointed Baines Professor of English Language in 1993, at the University of Liverpool. He was the Director of the Applied English Language Studies Unit between 1993 and 2003, and between 2008 and 2009 he was Dean of the University's Faculty of Arts. He also served as Director of Curriculum Development. In 2010, he became Pro-Vice-Chancellor International. Furthermore, Hoey served as Director of the Liverpool Confucius Institute. He was an Academician of the Academy of Social Sciences and a member of Council of the University of Chester.

Hoey was co-editor of a series of books on corpus linguistics published by Routledge, and also served as the chief adviser on the Macmillan English Dictionary, for which he also wrote the foreword. His administrative roles have included Chair of the Assessment and Qualifications Alliance's English Committee. He lectured in 40 countries and had visited 100.

== Themes ==
Hoey's work has been described as being "about texts, not isolated words or even words within a sentence." In 2007, Hans-Jörg Schmid wrote that Hoey "has long made himself a name as a keen promoter of a lexical approach to text analysis and text linguistics in general... Hoey has produced a number of influential publications in this area."

According to Alan Partington, much of Hoey's early work appeared "in conjunction with Eugene Winter and was dealing with discourse above the level of the sentence". Crucially, "the clauses ... of a discourse are related semantically, across clauses, sentences and paragraphs, even across different texts in a limited number of ways. Hoey wrote extensively on coherence and cohesive harmony.

== Main publications ==
On The Surface of Discourse (1983) focuses single semantic markers that are to be found intra-textual as well as inter-textual. His book Patterns of Lexis in Text (1991) has been published in a special edition by Oxford University Press and is used as a textbook in China. Partington describes this book as showing that "Hoey’s realisation that the majority of the physical signals of the semantic relations connecting the different parts of a text were lexical items of some sort, in addition to the sets of grammatical connectors previously described in the literature on cohesion."

Textual Interaction (2001) is described as follows: "Text can be defined as the visible evidence of a reasonably self-contained purposeful interaction between one or more writers and one or more readers, in which the writer(s) control the interaction and produce most of (characteristically all) the language." Lexical Priming. A new theory of words and language (2005) is seen as his seminal academic work.

== The Lexical Priming theory ==
Starting with a paper given in 1997 on colligation, Hoey developed the theory of Lexical Priming as a means to pull together ideas with regards to discourses and text cohesion elements he had investigated in his earlier books. From 2003 onwards, he looked at evidence of lexical priming in newspaper texts, focussed on textual positions of words and phrases (which became an AHRC-funded project in 2007) and looked at it in the light of creativity and, in many talks given, as a key to revolutionizing the teaching of English as a foreign language. In his own words: "Lexical priming is a theory intended to account for the existence of corpus linguistic phenomena such as collocation and colligation that cannot be explained in terms of logic or theoretical grammars of the generative kind. The explanation offered avoids circularity because it is not based on the data it seeks to explain but on work of psycholinguists over a thirty year period".

Michael Pace-Sigge has shown that the theory has foundations in psycholinguistics going back to the 1960s - in particular, work by Michael R. Quillian (1969) and James Neely (1976). In short, Hoey sums up the lexical priming theory as follows: "each encounter we have with a recurrent piece of language (word, phrase, morpheme etc.) primes us to recognise and reproduce the encountered piece of language, thereby also ensuring its continued recurrence. Since the recurrence subconsciously noted may be a replicated grammatical context or recognition of a shared semantics or reference, the reproduction need not be mechanical." This is also compatible with notions of creativity as existing notions of a word (or set of words) are either re-assigned or a speaker /writer deliberately seeks to be in breach of the expectation of their audience.

== The drinking-problem-hypotheses ==
This was first published in 1997. Hoey describes how these hypotheses were named as follows:

"In the film Airplane!, we are told of a pilot who is no longer permitted to fly because he has a ‘drinking problem’. The next shot shows him spilling a non-alcoholic drink all over himself; his problem is in the fact that he misses his mouth when he tries to drink. The joke depends on the order of words. … Although the collocation between drinking and problem is the same …, there is only one grammatical combination that can mean that someone has a problem getting liquid into his mouth or throat."

Thus the hypotheses are

1. Where it can be shown that a common sense of a polysemous word is primed to favour certain collocations, semantic associations and/or colligations, the rarer sense of the word will be primed to avoid these. …
2. Where two senses of a word are approximately as common as each other, they will both avoid each other’s collocations, semantic associations and/or colligations.
3. Where either (1) or (2) do not apply, the effect will be humour, ambiguity (momentarily or permanent), or a new meaning combining the two sentences.

== Outside Interests ==
Beyond the confines of academia, his interests were extraordinarily wide. He served, for instance, as a member of the West Midlands Arts Council, the President of a philatelic society, lay-preacher in his church. He was editor of a Campaign for Real Ale Society publication (called ‘Ale and Hearty’).

== Appraisal ==
- Patterns of Lexis in Text (1991): awarded the Duke of Edinburgh English-Speaking Union Prize for the best book on Applied Linguistics in 1991.
- Lexical Priming (2005): shortlisted for the BAAL Prize for best book in applied linguistics.

Professor Dinah Birch of Liverpool University describes him in 2021 as having been an "exceptionally thoughtful and devoted teacher and supervisor, and many students owe a great deal to his generously-shared expertise". Alan Partington, also in 2021, recalled Hoey's “lecturing style was vibrant, their content always thought-provoking."

== See also ==
- Charles J. Fillmore
- M. A. K. Halliday
- Randolph Quirk
- John McHardy Sinclair

== Bibliography ==
- Ventola, Eija (1991). Functional and Systemic Linguistics: Approaches and Uses (Trends in Linguistics: Studies & Monographs). Mouton de Gruyter. ISBN 3-11-012740-7.
- Hoey, M. (1983). On the Surface of Discourse. London: George Allen and Unwin. ISBN 9780044150039.
- Hoey, M. (1991). Sinclair, John; Carter, Ronald (eds.). Patterns of Lexis in Text. Oxford: Oxford University Press. ISBN 9780194371421.
- Hoey, M. (1994). "Signalling in discourse: a functional analysis of a common discourse pattern in written and spoken English". In Coulthard, M. (ed.). Advances in Written Text Analysis. London: Routledge. pp. 26–45. ISBN 9780415095204.
- Hoey, M. (1997). "From concordance to text structure: new uses for computer corpora". Proceedings of Practical Applications of Linguistic Corpora Conference. PALC '97. University of Lodz.
- Hoey, M. (2001). Textual Interaction. An Introduction to Written Discourse Analysis. London: Routledge. ISBN 9780415231695.
- Hoey, M. (2005). Lexical Priming: A New Theory of Words and Language. Routledge. ISBN 9780415328630.
- Hoey, M. (2007). "Lexical priming and literary creativity". Text, discourse and corpora: Theory and analysis. A&C Black. ISBN 9780826491725.
- Hoey, M. (2012). Textual colligation – where corpus linguistics and discourse analysis meet. CADSConf. University of Bologna.
- Hoey, M. (2013). "Introducing Challenge Panel Member: Michael Hoey". Lancaster University.
- Hoey, M. (2015). "The hidden narrative skills of George Crabbe: a literary stylistic analysis revisited". In Duguid, A.; Marchi, A.; Partington, A.; Taylor, C. (eds.). Gentle obsessions. Literature, linguistics and learning in honour of John Morley. Rome: Artemide. pp. 187–218. ISBN 9788875752231.
- Hoey, M. (2017a). "Foreword". In Pace-Sigge, M.; Patterson, K. (eds.). Lexical Priming: Applications and Advances. Studies in Corpus Linguistics. Vol. 79. Amsterdam: John Benjamins. pp. ix–xi. doi:10.1075/scl.79. ISBN 978-90-272-1076-0.
- Hoey, M. (2017b). "Cohesion and coherence in a content-specific corpus". In Pace-Sigge, M.; Patterson, K. (eds.). Lexical Priming: Applications and Advances. Studies in Corpus Linguistics. Vol. 79. Amsterdam: John Benjamins. pp. 3–40. doi:10.1075/scl.79. ISBN 978-90-272-1076-0.
