= Document structuring =

Document Structuring is a subtask of Natural language generation, which involves deciding the order and grouping (for example into paragraphs) of sentences in a generated text. It is closely related to the Content determination NLG task.

== Example ==
Assume we have four sentences which we want to include in a generated text

1. It will rain on Saturday
2. It will be sunny on Sunday
3. Max temperature will be 10 °C on Saturday
4. Max temperature will be 15 °C on Sunday

There are 24 (4!) orderings of these messages, including

- (1234) It will rain on Saturday. It will be sunny on Sunday. Max temperature will be 10 °C on Saturday. Max temperature will be 15 °C on Sunday.
- (2341) It will be sunny on Sunday. Max temperature will be 10 °C on Saturday. Max temperature will be 15 °C on Sunday. It will rain on Saturday.
- (4321) Max temperature will be 15 °C on Sunday. Max temperature will be 10 °C on Saturday. It will be sunny on Sunday. It will rain on Saturday.

Some of these orderings are better than others. For example, of the texts shown above, human readers prefer (1234) over (2314) and (4321).

For any ordering, there are also many ways in which sentences can be grouped into paragraphs and higher-level structures such as sections. For example, there are 8 (2**3) ways in which the sentences in (1234) can be grouped into paragraphs, including

- (12)(34)

It will rain on Saturday. It will be sunny on Sunday.
Max temperature will be 10 °C on Saturday. Max temperature will be 15 °C on Sunday.

- (1)(23)(4)

It will rain on Saturday.
It will be sunny on Sunday. Max temperature will be 10 °C on Saturday.
Max temperature will be 15 °C on Sunday.

As with ordering, human readers prefer some groupings over others; for example, (12)(34) is preferred over (1)(23)(4).

The document structuring task is to choose an ordering and grouping of sentences which results in a coherent and well-organised text from the reader's perspective.

== Algorithms and models ==
There are three basic approaches to document structuring: schemas, corpus-based, and heuristic.

Schemas are templates which explicitly specify sentence ordering and grouping for a document (as well as Content determination information). Typically they are constructed by manually analysing a corpus of human-written texts in the target genre, and extracting a document template from these texts. Schemas work well in practice for texts which are short (5 sentences or less) and/or have a standardised structure, but have problems in generating texts which are longer and do not have a fixed structure.

Corpus-based structuring techniques use statistical corpus analysis techniques to automatically build ordering and/or grouping models. Such techniques are common in Automatic summarisation, where a computer program automatically generates a summary of a textual document. In principle they could be applied to text generated from non-linguistic data, but this work is in its infancy; part of the challenge is that texts generated by Natural Language Generation systems are generally expected to be of fairly high quality, which is not always the case for texts generated by automatic summarisation systems.

The final approach is heuristic-based structuring. Such algorithms perform the structuring task based on heuristic rules, which can come from theories of rhetoric, psycholinguistic models, and/or a combination of intuition and feedback from pilot experiments with potential users. Heuristic-based structuring is appealing intellectually, but it can be difficult to get it to work well in practice, in part because heuristics often depend on semantic information (how sentences relate to each other) which is not always available. On the other hand, heuristic rules can focus on what is best for text readers, whereas the other approaches focus on imitating authors (and many human-authored texts are not well-structured).

== Narrative ==
Perhaps the ultimate document structuring challenge is to generate a good narrative—in other words, a text which starts by setting the scene and giving an introduction/overview; then describes a set of events in a clear fashion, so readers can easily see how the individual events are related and link together; and concludes with a summary/ending. Note that narrative in this sense applies to factual texts as well as stories. Current NLG systems do not do a good job of generating narratives, and this is a major source of user criticism.

Generating good narratives is a challenge for all aspects of NLG, but the most fundamental challenge is probably in document structuring.
