= Pro-form =

Word or form that substitutes for another word

In linguistics, a pro-form is a type of function word or expression that stands in for (expresses the same content as) another word, phrase, clause or sentence where the meaning is recoverable from the context. They are used either to avoid repetitive expressions or in quantification (limiting the variables of a proposition).

Pro-forms are divided into several categories, according to which part of speech they substitute:

- A pronoun substitutes a noun or a noun phrase, with or without a determiner: it, this.
- A prop-word: one, as in "the blue one"
- A pro-adjective substitutes an adjective or a phrase that functions as an adjective: so as in "It is less so than we had expected."
- A pro-adverb substitutes an adverb or a phrase that functions as an adverb: how or this way.
- A pro-verb substitutes a verb or a verb phrase: do, as in: "I will go to the party if you do".
- A pro-sentence substitutes an entire sentence or subsentence: Yes, or that as in "That is true".

An interrogative pro-form is a pro-form that denotes the (unknown) item in question and may itself fall into any of the above categories.

The rules governing allowable syntactic relations between certain pro-forms (notably personal and reflexive/reciprocal pronouns) and their antecedents have been studied in what is called binding theory.

== Table of correlatives ==
Some 19th-century grammars of Latin, such as Raphael Kühner's 1844 grammar, organized non-personal pronouns (interrogative, demonstrative, indefinite/quantifier, relative) in a table of "correlative" pronouns due to their similarities in morphological derivation and their syntactic relationships (as correlative pairs) in that language. Later that century, L. L. Zamenhof, the inventor of Esperanto, made use of the concept to systematically create the pro-forms and determiners of Esperanto in a regular table of correlatives. The table of correlatives for English follows.

Table of correlatives
		interrogative	demonstrative			quantifier				
		interrogative	proximal	medial	distal	assertive existential	elective/dubitative existential	universal	negatory	positive alternative
determiner		which what	this (sg.) these (pl.)	that (sg.) those (pl.)	yon yonder	some	any whichever whichsoever	every each all	no	another
pronoun	human	who whom (obj.)	this (one) (sg.) these (ones) (pl.)	that (one) (sg.) those (ones) (pl.)	yon yonder	someone somebody	anyone anybody whoever whomever (obj.) whosoever whomsoever (obj.)	everyone everybody all	no one nobody	another someone else somebody else
pronoun	nonhuman	what	this (one) (sg.) these (ones) (pl.)	that (one) (sg.) those (ones) (pl.)	yon yonder	something	anything whatever whatsoever	everything all	nothing	something else else other
pronoun	out of two (dual)	which	this one (sg.) these (ones) (pl.)	that one (sg.) those (ones) (pl.)	yon yonder	one	either whichever whichsoever	both	neither	other
pronoun	out of many (plural)	which	this one (sg.) these (ones) (pl.)	that one (sg.) those (ones) (pl.)	yon yonder	some (pl.) one (sg.)	any whichever whichsoever	each all	none	another
pro-adverb	location	where	here	there	yonder	somewhere	anywhere wherever wheresoever	everywhere	nowhere	elsewhere
pro-adverb	source	whence	hence	thence		somewhence	anywhence whencever whencesoever	everywhence	nowhence	elsewhence
pro-adverb	goal	whither	hither	thither		somewhither	anywhither whitherever whithersoever	everywhither	nowhither	elsewhither
pro-adverb	time	when	now	then		sometime somewhen	anytime anywhen whenever whensoever	ever always everywhen every time	never nowhen	another time elsewhen
pro-adverb	manner	how whereby	so hereby	thus thereby		somehow	anyhow however howsoever	everyway everywise	no way nowise	otherwise elsewise
pro-adverb	reason	why wherefore	herefore	therefore		for some reason somewhy	whyever whysoever	for every reason	for no reason nowhy	

Some languages may have more categories. See demonstrative.

Note that some categories are regular and some are not. They may be regular or irregular also depending on languages. The following chart shows comparison between English, French (irregular) and Japanese (regular):

	interrogative	quantifier	
	interrogative	existential	negative
human	who qui dare	someone quelqu'un dareka	no one (neg. +) personne daremo + neg.
nonhuman	what que nani	something quelque chose nanika	nothing rien nanimo + neg.
location	where où doko	somewhere quelque part dokoka	nowhere nulle part dokomo + neg.

(Note that "daremo", "nanimo" and "dokomo" are universal quantifiers with positive verbs.)

Some languages do not distinguish interrogative and indefinite pro-forms. In Mandarin, "Shéi yǒu wèntí?" means either "Who has a question?" or "Does anyone have a question?", depending on context.

== See also ==
- Anaphora (linguistics) – Use of an expression whose interpretation depends on context
- Deixis – Words requiring context to understand their meaning
- Pro-drop language – Language in which certain pronouns may sometimes be omitted
- Referent – Person or thing to which a linguistic expression or other symbol refers
