= Demonstrative =

Words indicating which object is being referred to

Demonstratives (abbreviated dem) are words, such as this and that, used to indicate which entities are being referred to and to distinguish these entities from others. They are typically deictic, their meaning depending on a particular frame of reference, and cannot be understood without context. Demonstratives are often used in spatial deixis (where the speaker or sometimes the listener is to provide context), but also in intra-discourse reference (including abstract concepts) or anaphora, where the meaning is dependent on something other than the relative physical location of the speaker. An example is whether something is currently being said or was said earlier.

Demonstrative constructions include demonstrative adjectives or demonstrative determiners, which specify nouns (as in Put that coat on), and demonstrative pronouns, which stand independently (as in Put that on). The demonstratives in English are this, that, these, those, and the archaic yon and yonder, along with this one, these ones, that one and those ones as substitutes for the pronouns.

== Contrasts in demonstrative systems ==
=== Distal and proximal demonstratives ===
Many languages, such as English and Standard Chinese, make a two-way distinction between demonstratives. Typically, one set of demonstratives is proximal, indicating objects close to the speaker (English this), and the other series is distal, indicating objects further removed from the speaker (English that).

Other languages, like Finnish, Nandi, Hawaiian, Latin, Spanish, Portuguese, Italian (in some formal writing), Armenian, Serbo-Croatian, Macedonian, Georgian, Basque, Korean, Japanese, Ukrainian, Bengali, and Sri Lankan Tamil make a three-way distinction. Typically there is a distinction between proximal or first person (objects near to the speaker), medial or second person (objects near to the addressee), and distal or third person (objects far from both). So for example, in Portuguese:

- Esta maçã
"this apple"
- Essa maçã
"that apple (near you)"
- Aquela maçã
"that apple (over there, away from both of us)" (Note: In Brazilian Portuguese "este" (this) is sometimes reduced to "es'e", making it sound like "esse" (that).)

Further oppositions are created with place adverbs.

- Essa maçã aqui
"this apple (next to me or next to you-and-me)"
- Essa maçã aí
"that apple (next to you)"
- Aquela maçã ali
"that apple (far from you-and-me)"
- Aquela maçã lá
"that apple (which is far from you-and-me or is in another distant place from you-and-me)"

in Italian (medial pronouns, in most of Italy, only survive in historical texts and bureaucratic texts. However, they're of wide and very common usage in some Regions, like Tuscany):

- Questa mela
"this apple"
- Codesta mela
"that apple (near you)"
- Quella mela
"yon apple (over there, away from both of us)"

in Hawaiian:

- Kēia ʻukulele
"this ukulele"
- kēnā ʻukulele
"that ukulele (near you)"
- kēlā ʻukulele
"yon ukulele (over there, away from both of us)"

in Armenian (based on the proximal "s", medial "d/t", and distal "n"):

այս խնձորը
ays khndzorë
"this apple"

այդ խնձորը
ayd khndzorë
"that apple (near you)"

այն խնձորը
ayn khndzorë
"yon apple (over there, away from both of us)"

and, in Georgian:

ამისი მამა
amisi mama
"this one's father"

იმისი ცოლი
imisi coli
"that one's wife"

მაგისი სახლი
magisi saxli
"that (by you) one's house"

and, in Ukrainian (note that Ukrainian has not only number, but also three grammatical genders in singular):

- цей чоловік, ця жінка, це яблуко, ці яблука
"this man", "this woman", "this apple", "these apples"
- той чоловік, та жінка, те яблуко, ті яблука
"that man", "that woman", "that apple", "those apples"
- он той чоловік, он та жінка, он те яблуко, он ті яблука
"yon man (over there, away from both of us)", "that woman (over there, away from both of us)", "yon apple (over there, away from both of us)", "yons apples (over there, away from both of us)"

and, in Japanese:

この リンゴ
kono ringo
"this apple"

その リンゴ
sono ringo
"that apple"

あの リンゴ
ano ringo
"that apple (over there)"

In Nandi (Kalenjin of Kenya, Uganda and Eastern Congo):

Chego chu, Chego choo, Chego chuun

"this milk", "that milk" (near the second person) and "that milk" (away from the first and second person, near a third person or even further away).

Ancient Greek has a three-way distinction between ὅδε (hóde "this here"), οὗτος (hoûtos "this"), and ἐκεῖνος (ekeînos "that").

Spanish, Tamil and Seri also make this distinction. French has a two-way distinction, with the use of postpositions "-ci" (proximal) and "-là" (distal) as in cet homme-ci and cet homme-là, as well as the pronouns ce and cela/ça. English has an archaic but occasionally used three-way distinction of this, that, and yonder.

Arabic has also a three-way distinction in its formal Classical and Modern Standard varieties. Arabic demonstrative pronouns primarily inflect for number and gender. They only inflect for case in the dual. Their plural forms are invariable (i.e., inflecting for neither gender nor case). They inflect for gender but not case in the singular. The proximal-medial-distal distinction is as follows:

- هذا الرجل (haːðaː arrajul) 'this man'.
- ذاك الرجل (ðaːka arrajul) 'that man'.
- ذلك الرجل (ðaːlika arrajul) 'that man' (over there).

In Modern German (and the Scandinavian languages), the non-selective deictic das Kind, der Kleine, die Kleine and the selective one das Kind, der Kleine, die Kleine are homographs, but they are spoken differently. The non-selective deictics are unstressed whereas the selective ones (demonstratives) are stressed. There is a second selective deictic, namely dieses Kind, dieser Kleine, diese Kleine. Distance either from the speaker or from the addressee is either marked by the opposition between these two deictics or by the addition of a place deictic.

Distance-marking Thing Demonstrative

dieses Mädchen ~ das Mädchen
"this girl" ~ "that girl"

Thing Demonstrative plus Distance-marking Place Demonstrative

das Mädchen hier ~ das Mädchen da
dieses Mädchen hier ~ dieses Mädchen da
"this girl here" ~ "that girl over there"

A distal demonstrative exists in German, cognate to the English yonder, but it is used mainly in formal registers.

jenes Mädchen
"yonder girl"

Cognates of "yonder" still exist in some Northern English and Scots dialects;

"This shop here"

"That shop across the street"

"Yon shop down the street"
(that shop that is/used to be down the street)

There are languages which make a four-way distinction, such as Northern Sami:

- Dát biila
"this car"
- Diet biila
"that car (near you)"
- Duot biila
"that car (over there, away from both of us but rather near)"
- Dot biila
"that car (over there, far away)"

These four-way distinctions are often termed proximal, mesioproximal, mesiodistal, and distal.

=== Non-distal contrasts ===
Many non-European languages make further distinctions; for example, whether the object referred to is uphill or downhill from the speaker (Akhvakh), whether the object is visible or not (as in Malagasy), and whether the object can be pointed to as a whole or only in part. The Eskimo–Aleut languages, and the Kiranti branch of the Sino-Tibetan language family are particularly well known for their many contrasts.

The demonstratives in Seri are compound forms based on the definite articles (themselves derived from verbs) and therefore incorporate the positional information of the articles (standing, sitting, lying, coming, going) in addition to the three-way spatial distinction. This results in a quite elaborated set of demonstratives.

== Demonstrative series in other languages ==
Latin had several sets of demonstratives, including hic, haec, hoc ("this near me"); iste, ista, istud ("that near you"); and ille, illa, illud ("that over there") – note that Latin has not only number, but also three grammatical genders. The third set of Latin demonstratives (ille, etc.), developed into the definite articles in most Romance languages, such as el, la, los, las in Spanish, and le, la, les in French.

With the exception of Romanian, and some varieties of Spanish and Portuguese, the neuter gender has been lost in the Romance languages. Spanish and Portuguese have kept neuter demonstratives:

Spanish	Portuguese	gender
este	este	masculine
esta	esta	feminine
esto	isto	neuter

Some forms of Spanish (Caribbean Spanish, Andalusian Spanish, etc.) also occasionally employ ello, which is an archaic survival of the neuter pronoun from Latin illud.

Neuter demonstratives refer to ideas of indeterminate gender, such as abstractions and groups of heterogeneous objects, and has a limited agreement in Portuguese, for example, "all of that" can be translated as "todo aquele" (m), "toda aquela" (f) or "tudo aquilo" (n) in Portuguese, although the neuter forms require a masculine adjective agreement: "Tudo (n) aquilo (n) está quebrado (m)" (All of that is broken).

Classical Chinese had three main demonstrative pronouns: proximal 此 (this), distal 彼 (that), and distance-neutral 是 (this or that). The frequent use of 是 as a resumptive demonstrative pronoun that reasserted the subject before a noun predicate caused it to develop into its colloquial use as a copula by the Han period and subsequently its standard use as a copula in Modern Standard Chinese. Modern Mandarin has two main demonstratives, proximal 這/这 and distal 那; its use of the three Classical demonstratives has become mostly idiomatic, although 此 continues to be used with some frequency in modern written Chinese. Cantonese uses proximal 呢 and distal 嗰 instead of 這 and 那, respectively.

Similarly, Northern Wu languages tend to also have a distance-neutral demonstrative 搿, which is etymologically a checked-tone derivation of 個. In lects such as Shanghainese, distance-based demonstratives exist, but are only used constrastively. Suzhounese, on the other hand, has several demonstratives that form a two-way contrast, but also have 搿, which is neutral.

Hungarian has two spatial demonstratives: ez (this) and az (that). These inflect for number and case even in attributive position (attributes usually remain uninflected in Hungarian) with possible orthographic changes; e.g., ezzel (with this), abban (in that). A third degree of deixis is also possible in Hungarian, with the help of the am- prefix: amaz (that there). The use of this, however, is emphatic (when the speaker wishes to emphasize the distance) and not mandatory.

The Cree language has a special demonstrative for "things just gone out of sight," and Ilocano, a language of the Philippines, has three words for this referring to a visible object, a fourth for things not in view and a fifth for things that no longer exist." The Tiriyó language has a demonstrative for "things audible but non-visible"

While most languages and language families have demonstrative systems, some have systems highly divergent from or more complex than the relatively simple systems employed in Indo-European languages. In Yupik languages, notably in the Chevak Cup’ik language, there exists a 29-way distinction in demonstratives, with demonstrative indicators distinguished according to placement in a three-dimensional field around the interlocutor(s), as well as by visibility and whether or not the object is in motion.

== Demonstrative determiners and pronouns ==
It is relatively common for a language to distinguish between demonstrative determiners or demonstrative adjectives (sometimes also called determinative demonstratives, adjectival demonstratives or adjectival demonstrative pronouns) and demonstrative pronouns (sometimes called independent demonstratives, substantival demonstratives, independent demonstrative pronouns or substantival demonstrative pronouns).

A demonstrative determiner specifies a noun as definite, singular or plural, and proximal or distal:

This apple is good.
I like those houses.

A demonstrative pronoun stands on its own, replacing rather than modifying a noun:

This is good.
I like those.

There are four common demonstrative pronouns in English: this, that, these, those.

In formal contexts, such is sometimes used as a demonstrative determiner to indicate something described by the preceding statement(s) (e.g. "It was a scandal, but we don't usually discuss such things."). However, the use of such as a demonstrative pronoun has become archaic outside of certain fossilized expressions (e.g. "such is life"). Historically, so was sometimes used in place of such when used as a demonstrative pronoun, but it has gone through a similar process of fossilization (e.g. "you should have said so").

Some dialects, such as Southern American English, also use yon and yonder, where the latter is usually employed as a demonstrative determiner. Author Bill Bryson laments the "losses along the way" of yon and yonder:

Today we have two demonstrative pronouns, this and that, but in Shakespeare's day there was a third, yon (as in the Milton line "Him that yon soars on golden wing"), which suggested a further distance than that. You could talk about this hat, that hat, and yon hat. Today the word survives as a colloquial adjective, yonder, but our speech is fractionally impoverished for its loss.

== Demonstrative adverbs ==
Many languages have sets of demonstrative adverbs that are closely related to the demonstrative pronouns in a language. For example, corresponding to the demonstrative pronoun that are the adverbs such as then (= "at that time"), there (= "at that place"), thither (= "to that place"), thence (= "from that place"); equivalent adverbs corresponding to the demonstrative pronoun this are now, here, hither, hence. A similar relationship exists between the interrogative pronoun what and the interrogative adverbs when, where, whither, whence. See pro-form for a full table.

== Discourse deixis ==
As mentioned above, while the primary function of demonstratives is to provide spatial references of concrete objects (that (building), this (table)), there is a secondary function: referring to items of discourse. For example:

This sentence is short.
This is what I mean: I am happy with him.
That way of looking at it is wrong.
I said her dress looked hideous. She didn't like that.

In the above, this sentence refers to the sentence being spoken, and the pronoun this refers to what is about to be spoken; that way refers to "the previously mentioned way", and the pronoun that refers to the content of the previous statement. These are abstract entities of discourse, not concrete objects. Each language may have subtly different rules on how to use demonstratives to refer to things previously spoken, currently being spoken, or about to be spoken. In English, that (or occasionally those) refers to something previously spoken, while this (or occasionally these) refers to something about to be spoken (or, occasionally, something being simultaneously spoken).

== See also ==
- Deixis
- Pro-form
