= Endophora =

Expressions that derive their reference from something within the surrounding text

Endophora refers to the phenomenon of expressions that derive their reference from something within the surrounding text.

For example, in the sentences "I saw Sally yesterday. She was lying on the beach", "she" is an endophoric expression because it refers to something mentioned elsewhere in the text, i.e. "Sally".

By contrast, "She was lying on the beach," if it appeared by itself, contains an exophoric expression; "she" refers to something that is not present in the surrounding text, so there is not enough information given within the text to independently determine to whom "she" refers. It can refer to someone the speaker assumes his audience has prior knowledge of, or it can refer to a person he is showing to his listeners. Without further information, in other words, there is no way of knowing the exact meaning of an exophoric term.

Endophora can be broken into three subcategories: cataphora, anaphora and self-reference.

== See also ==
- Deixis – Words requiring context to understand their meaning
- Generic antecedent – Representatives of classes in a situation in which gender is typically unknown
- Homophora – Reference to something not in the immediate text
- Metaphor – Figure of speech of implicit comparison
- Metonymy – Figure of speech in which something is referred to by the name of an associated thing
- Synecdoche – Figure of speech
