= Wolfgang U. Dressler =

Austrian linguist

- Born: 22 December 1939 (age 86)

Academic background
- Education: University of Vienna

Academic work
- Discipline: Linguist
- Institutions: University of Vienna

Wolfgang Ulrich Dressler (born 22 December 1939) is an Austrian professor of linguistics at the University of Vienna. Dressler is a polyglot and scholar who has contributed to various fields of linguistics, especially phonology, morphology, text linguistics, clinical linguistics and child language development. He is an important representative of the 'naturalness theory'.

== Career ==
After studying linguistics and classical philology in Vienna (1957–1962), Dressler spent time in Rome and Paris and worked both at the Austrian Academy of Sciences and the Department of Linguistics of the University of Vienna, finishing his habilitation in 1968. He joined the Department of Linguistics in Vienna in 1964. In 1970, he went to the United States, working as associate professor, and returned to Vienna in 1971, when he was appointed professor for general and applied linguistics at the University of Vienna. Since then, Dressler has been based there, while still travelling and teaching at other universities.

== Publications ==
Dressler has written more than 400 publications, among them:

- Dressler, W.U. & R. de Beaugrande 1981: Introduction to Text Linguistics. London, Longman 1981. Einführung in die Textlinguistik. Tübingen, Niemeyer.
- Dressler, W.U. 1985: Morphonology. Ann Arbor, Karoma Press.
- Dressler, W.U. & W. Mayerthaler, O. Panagl, W.U. Wurzel 1988: Leitmotifs in Natural Morphology. Amsterdam, Benjamins.
- Dressler, W.U. & Lavinia Merlini Barbaresi 1994: Morphopragmatics. Berlin: Mouton de Gruyter 1994.

== Linguistic research ==
In the beginning of his career, Dressler worked on Indo-European topics. After 1969, he began publishing in the field of text linguistics. After a few publications within the then new framework of generative grammar, he permanently turned away from this model and has become a profound critic with a strong science-theoretical and semiotic background.

Around the same time, Dressler worked on Breton language from a phonological, text linguistic and sociolinguistic perspective ('language death'). At that time morphology, phonology and morphonology were also of interest to him. Since 1972, what was later called 'sociophonology' has been developed, first as 'fast speech rules', later in a refined model on 'casual speech' and competing phonological processes and rules.

From 1973 onwards, in search of 'external evidence' for linguistic theoretical assumptions (as opposed to generative models, but as an important science-theoretical background for theoretical arguments), Dressler became interested in the disturbed speech of aphasia. Similarly, he started to work with psychologists on a model of psychological '(de)activation' for phonological processes and, with his background in IE studies, he compared historical evidence with his phonological theory, making conclusions about rules, processes and the boundaries of phonological theory towards morpho(no)logy.

In his contributions in morphology, Dressler established, together with Wolfgang Wurzel and Oswald Panagl, a subtheory of 'Natural Morphology' based on the establishment of more or less "natural" operations on universal, typological, or language-specific levels, respectively. In a monograph on morphonology, he proved morphonology to be a subtype of morphology, contrary to contemporary claims in generative phonology of its being treated as a phonological phenomenon. Dressler proposed a model of morphological operations between lexical and grammatical functions, thereby establishing a gradual scale between derivational and inflectional processes. His theory explains why derivational rules apply before inflectional rules, and why 'unprototypical' derivation such as diminutive and 'unprototypical' inflections such as plural formation sometimes get mixed in the middle: cf. German "Kind-er-chen" (child-PL-DIM), in which derivation occurs after inflection.

For Dressler, language phenomena interact at different levels of linguistic organisation with more or less "natural" operations or states which might, however, lead to competition between them, so that an "ideal" state of the system is unlikely to be reached—which in turn may explain the usual grammaticalization channels in language change and language use. Therefore, Dressler coined the term 'polycentristic theory' of word formation in 1977, then in 1983 'polycentristic language theory'.

Due to his science-theoretical interests, Dressler introduced a semiotic model (following Charles Sanders Peirce) into linguistic theory. This 'semiotic model' reappears in Dressler's publications time and again as prerequisite for theoretical assumptions in various fields.

Dressler finally adopted the model of 'Natural Phonology' as developed by David Stampe and Patricia Donegan, but refined it with his semiotic science-theoretical considerations. This may seem an unnecessary addition, but in fact firmly puts the model on a very solid meta-theory. Following this new trend, together with Willi Mayerthaler, Oswald Panagl and Wolfgang U. Wurzel, Dressler coined the term 'Natural Morphology' for their way to look at morphological processes. Here again, a semiotic foundation of the model strongly influenced his explanations, much more than with the other authors.

Dressler has to be named a typologist. Both in phonology and morphology, he sees the common ground of languages in more general principles of how signs can be used (= semiotics).

Then, Dressler turned towards morphopragmatics, the pragmatic uses of morphological elements. He investigated the uses of diminutives and similar phenomena, again creatively combining formal and semantic (or pragmatic) aspects in innovative ways.

Finally, Dressler developed a new model of language development, that of pre- and proto-morphology. Dressler assumes that language is self-organising in the child, thereby passing through a stage 'before' morphology and then through a stage of a very simple morphology, until finally the child learns to adapt to the adult target model of grammar. In other words, a child neither inherits nor learns a grammatical function, but is able to gradually derive the full morphological meaning from fewer and more concrete functions which are developed and discovered first.
