= Cataphora =

Expression co-referring with a more specific one

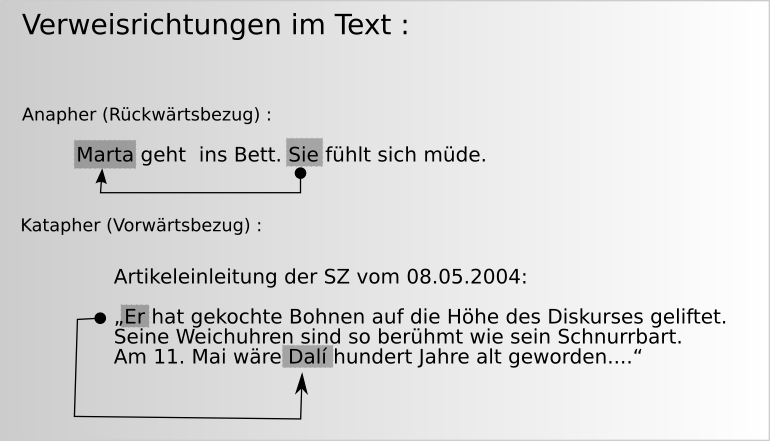
Example of a cataphora in German

In linguistics, cataphora (/kəˈtæfərə/) is the use of an expression or word that co-refers with a later, more specific expression in the discourse. The preceding expression, whose meaning is determined or specified by the later expression, may be called a cataphor. Cataphora is in contrast to anaphora which denotes cases where the order of the expressions is the reverse of that found in cataphora.

An example of cataphora in English is the following sentence:

- When he arrived home, John went to sleep.

In this sentence, the pronoun he (the cataphor) appears earlier than the noun John (the postcedent) that it refers to. This is the reverse of the more normal pattern, "strict" anaphora, where a referring expression such as John (in the example above) or the soldier (in the example below) appears before any pronouns that reference it. Both cataphora and anaphora are types of endophora.

== Etymology ==
The term cataphora comes from Ancient Greek: καταφορά, romanized: kataphora, lit. 'a downward motion' from κατά, kata 'downwards' and φέρω, pherō 'I carry'.

== Examples ==
Other examples of the same type of cataphora are:

- If you want some, here's some parmesan cheese.
- After he had received his orders, the soldier left the barracks.
- If you want them, there are cookies in the kitchen.

Cataphora across sentences is often used for rhetorical effect. It can build suspense and provide a description. For example:

- He's the biggest slob I know. He's really stupid. He's so cruel. He's my boyfriend Nick.

The examples of cataphora described so far are strict cataphora, because the anaphor is an actual pronoun. Strict within-sentence cataphora is highly restricted in the sorts of structures it can appear within, generally restricted to a preceding subordinate clause. More generally, however, any fairly general noun phrase can be considered an anaphor when it co-refers with a more specific noun phrase (i.e. both refer to the same entity), and if the more general noun phrase comes first, it can be considered an example of cataphora. Non-strict cataphora of this sort can occur in many contexts, for example:

- A little girl, Jessica, was playing on the swings.

(The anaphor a little girl co-refers with Jessica.)

- Finding the right gadget was a real hassle. I finally settled with a digital camera.

(The anaphor the right gadget co-refers with a digital camera.)

Strict cross-sentence cataphora where the antecedent is an entire sentence is fairly common cross-linguistically:

- I should have known it: The task is simply too difficult.
- Ich hätte es wissen müssen: Die Aufgabe ist einfach zu schwer. (Same as previous sentence, in German.)

Cataphora of this sort is particularly common in formal contexts, using an anaphoric expression such as this or the following. Such expressions are often used in conjunction with a colon.

- This is what I believe: that all men were created equal.
- After squaring both sides, we arrive at the following: $x = y^3 + 2z - 1$.

== See also ==
- Exophora – Reference to something not in the immediate text
- Apposition – Grammatical construction wherein two adjacent elements identify each other
