= Referring expression =

Noun phrase, or surrogate, functioning to identify some individual object

In linguistics, a referring expression (RE) is any noun phrase, or surrogate for a noun phrase, whose function in discourse is to identify some individual object. The technical terminology for identify differs a great deal from one school of linguistics to another. The most widespread term is probably refer, and a thing identified is a referent, as for example in the work of John Lyons. In linguistics, the study of reference relations belongs to pragmatics, the study of language use, though it is also a matter of great interest to philosophers, especially those wishing to understand the nature of knowledge, perception and cognition more generally.

Various devices can be used for reference including determiners, pronouns, proper names. Reference relations can be of different kinds; referents can be in a "real" or imaginary world, or in discourse itself, and they may be singular, plural, or collective.

== Kinds ==
The kinds of expressions which can refer are:

1. a noun phrase of any structure, such as: the taxi in The taxi's waiting outside; the apple on the table in Bring me the apple on the table; and those five boys in Those five boys were off school last week. In those languages which, like English, encode definiteness, REs are typically marked for definiteness. In the examples given, this is done by the definite article the or the demonstrative adjective, here those.
2. a noun-phrase surrogate, i.e. a pronoun, such as it in It's waiting outside and Bring me it; and they in They were off school last week. The referent of such a pronoun may vary according to context - e.g. the referent of me depends on who the speaker is - and this property is technically an instance of deixis.
3. a proper name, like Sarah, London, The Eiffel Tower, or The Beatles. The intimate link between proper names and type (1) REs are shown by the definite article that appears in many of them. In many languages this happens far more consistently than in English. Proper names are often taken to refer, in principle, to the same referent independently of the context in which the name is used and in all possible worlds, i.e. they are in Saul Kripke's terminology rigid designators.

Referring can take place in a number of ways. Typically, in the case of (1), the RE is likely to succeed in picking out the referent because the words in the expression and the way they are combined give a true, accurate, description of the referent, in such a way that the hearer of the expression can recognize the speaker's intention. In the first example, if the hearer knows what an apple and a table are, and understands the relation expressed by on, and is aware that the is a signal that an individual thing or person is intended, they can build up the meaning of the expression from the words and grammar and use it to identify an intended object (often within sight, or at any rate easily recoverable, but not necessarily).

The speaker may use a mistaken description and still manage to refer successfully. If the speaker asks the hearer to "Take this plate to the woman with the glass of vodka", the hearer may take it to the intended person even if, unbeknownst to the speaker, the vodka is really water. On the other hand, the speaker may be accurate in calling it vodka, but the hearer may believe wrongly that it is water, and therefore not deliver the plate. Accurate reference is then not a guarantee of successful reference, and successful reference does not wholly depend on accurate reference. There is, however, a strong positive correlation between them.

Proper names, on the other hand, generally achieve reference irrespective of the meaning of the words which constitute them (if any are recognizable). If a local pub is called The Anchor, this is simply a label which functions conversationally with no appeal to the meaning of the words. If someone says, I'm going to the Anchor, they do not mean I'm going to the device for halting and securing a ship, and the hearer will not necessarily call such a device to mind when I say this. The Anchor just serves to identify a particular building. This point is more obvious still with those names like Sarah and London which have no lexical meaning of their own.

== Kinds of reference relations ==
In addition to the singular and plural reference (in many languages grammatically obvious), linguists typically distinguish individual or specific reference, exemplified by each case presented so far, from generic reference, where a singular expression picks out a type of object rather than an individual one, as in The bear is a dangerous animal. Plural expressions can, of course, be interpreted in the same way, as in Bears are dangerous animals.

Definite reference to single individuals is usually taken to be the prototypical type of reference.

Other types of reference recognized by linguists include indefinite as opposed to definite reference, and collective and distributive reference. Definite referring expressions refer to an identifiable individual or class (The Dalai Lama; The Coldstream Guards; the student with the highest marks), whilst indefinite referring expressions allow latitude in identifying the referent (a corrupt Member of Parliament; a cat with black ears—where a is to be interpreted as 'any' or 'some actual but unspecified'). Collective reference is the picking out of the members of a set as a set, whilst distributive reference is the picking out of the members of a set individually. The difference may not be marked linguistically, but arrived at by interpretation in context. Compare Manchester United won again today (where the reference of Manchester United is to members of the team as a unit), with Manchester United wear red shirts and black shorts (where the reference of Manchester United is to the team members as individuals). English allows such expressions to be ambiguous: compare Manchester United are rich beyond my wildest dreams.

== Reference and denotation ==
Denotation is the relation existing between a lexical item and a set of potential referents in some world. Reference is the relation between some expression and actual referents (subject to the technical restriction given above). The word rabbit denotes the entire class of objects that are classified with this term, whilst the RE my rabbit will generally refer, on a particular occasion of usage, to the one individual in my possession. Generally speaking, lexical items have denotation, whilst phrases have the job of doing reference in real situations. This distinction is not systematically made by some linguists.

=== Some technical linguistic characteristics ===
REs carry a presupposition of the existence of the referent(s), in some universe of discourse, including fictional universes.

There are many other technical issues surrounding the nature of reference. Some of these are discussed from the perspective of linguistics in Lyons (1977, vol. I: chapter 7); Cann (1993: chapters 9 and 10); Saeed (1997: chapters 2, 7, 11). There is a vast literature on the topic in philosophy.

== Referring expression generation ==
Referring expression generation (REG) is the subtask of natural language generation (NLG) that receives much scholarly attention. While NLG is concerned with the conversion of non-linguistic information into natural language, REG focuses only on the creation of referring expressions (noun phrases) that identify specific entities called targets by describing their attributes that are most distinct from those of the distractors.

== Bibliography ==
- Cann, Ronnie (1993). Formal semantics. Cambridge University Press.
- Kripke, Saul (1980). Naming and necessity, second edition. Basil Blackwell.
- Lyons, John (1977). Semantics. Cambridge University Press.
- Saeed, John (1997). Semantics. Blackwell.
