= Anaphora (linguistics) =

Use of an expression whose interpretation depends on context

In linguistics, anaphora (/əˈnæfərə, -frə/) is the use of an expression whose interpretation depends upon another expression in context (its antecedent). In a narrower sense, anaphora is the use of an expression that depends specifically upon an antecedent expression and thus is contrasted with cataphora, which is the use of an expression that depends upon a postcedent expression. The anaphoric (referring) term is called an anaphor. For example, in the sentence Sally arrived, but nobody saw her, the pronoun her is an anaphor, referring back to the antecedent Sally. In the sentence Before her arrival, nobody saw Sally, the pronoun her refers forward to the postcedent Sally, so her is now a cataphor (and an anaphor in the broader sense, but not in the narrower one). Usually, an anaphoric expression is a pro-form or some other kind of deictic (contextually dependent) expression. Both anaphora and cataphora are species of endophora, referring to something mentioned elsewhere in a dialog or text.

Anaphora is an important concept for different reasons and on different levels: first, anaphora indicates how discourse is constructed and maintained; second, anaphora binds different syntactical elements together at the level of the sentence; third, anaphora presents a challenge to natural language processing in computational linguistics, since the identification of the reference can be difficult; and fourth, anaphora partially reveals how language is understood and processed, which is relevant to fields of linguistics interested in cognitive psychology.

== Nomenclature and examples ==
The term anaphora is actually used in two ways.

In a broad sense, it denotes the act of referring. Any time a given expression (e.g. a pro-form) refers to another contextual entity, anaphora is present.

In a second, narrower sense, the term anaphora denotes the act of referring backwards in a dialog or text, such as referring to the left when an anaphor points to its left toward its antecedent in languages that are written from left to right. Etymologically, anaphora derives from Ancient Greek ἀναφορά (anaphorá, 'a carrying back'), from ἀνά (aná, 'up') + φέρω (phérō, 'I carry'). In this narrow sense, anaphora stands in contrast to cataphora, which sees the act of referring forward in a dialog or text, or pointing to the right in languages that are written from left to right: Ancient Greek καταφορά (kataphorá, 'a downward motion'), from κατά (katá, 'downwards') + φέρω. A pro-form is a cataphor when it points to its right toward its postcedent. Both effects together are called either anaphora (broad sense) or less ambiguously, along with self-reference they comprise the category of endophora.

Examples of anaphora (in the narrow sense) and cataphora are given next. Anaphors and cataphors appear in bold, and their antecedents and postcedents are underlined:

Anaphora (in the narrow sense, species of endophora)

a. Susan dropped the plate. It shattered loudly. – The pronoun it is an anaphor; it points to the left toward its antecedent the plate.

b. The music stopped, and that upset everyone. – The demonstrative pronoun that is an anaphor; it points to the left toward its antecedent The music stopped.

c. Fred was angry, and so was I. – The adverb so is an anaphor; it points to the left toward its antecedent angry.

d. If Sam buys a new bike, I shall do it as well. – The verb phrase do it is an anaphor; it points to the left toward its antecedent buys a new bike.

Cataphora (included in the broad sense of anaphora, species of endophora)

a. Because he was very cold, David put on his coat. – The pronoun he is a cataphor; it points to the right toward its postcedent David.

b. Although Sam might do so, I shall not buy a new bike. – The verb phrase do so is a cataphor; it points to the right toward its postcedent buy a new bike.

c. In their free time, the boys play video games. – The possessive adjective their is a cataphor; it points to the right toward its postcedent the boys.

A further distinction is drawn between endophoric and exophoric reference. Exophoric reference occurs when an expression, an exophor, refers to something that is not directly present in the linguistic context, but is rather present in the situational context. Deictic pro-forms are stereotypical exophors, e.g.

Exophora

a. This garden hose is better than that one. – The demonstrative adjectives this and that are exophors; they point to entities in the situational context.

b. Jerry is standing over there. – The adverb there is an exophor; it points to a location in the situational context.

Exophors cannot be anaphors as they do not substantially refer within the dialog or text, though there is a question of what portions of a conversation or document are accessed by a listener or reader with regard to whether all references to which a term points within that language stream are noticed (i.e., if you hear only a fragment of what someone says using the pronoun her, you might never discover who she is, though if you heard the rest of what the speaker was saying on the same occasion, you might discover who she is, either by anaphoric revelation or by exophoric implication because you realize who she must be according to what else is said about her even if her identity is not explicitly mentioned, as in the case of homophoric reference).

A listener might, for example, realize through listening to other clauses and sentences that she is a Queen because of some of her attributes or actions mentioned. But which queen? Homophoric reference occurs when a generic phrase obtains a specific meaning through knowledge of its context. For example, the referent of the phrase the Queen (using an emphatic definite article, not the less specific a Queen, but also not the more specific Queen Elizabeth) must be determined by the context of the utterance, which would identify the identity of the queen in question. Until further revealed by additional contextual words, gestures, images or other media, a listener would not even know what monarchy or historical period is being discussed, and even after hearing her name is Elizabeth does not know, even if an English-UK Queen Elizabeth becomes indicated, if this queen means Queen Elizabeth I or Queen Elizabeth II and must await further clues in additional communications. Similarly, in discussing 'The Mayor' (of a city), the Mayor's identity must be understood broadly through the context which the speech references as general 'object' of understanding; is a particular human person meant, a current or future or past office-holder, the office in a strict legal sense, or the office in a general sense which includes activities a mayor might conduct, might even be expected to conduct, while they may not be explicitly defined for this office.

== In generative grammar ==
The term anaphor is used in a special way in the generative grammar tradition. Here it denotes what would normally be called a reflexive or reciprocal pronoun, such as himself or each other in English, and analogous forms in other languages. The use of the term anaphor in this narrow sense is unique to generative grammar, and in particular, to the traditional binding theory. This theory investigates the syntactic relationship that can or must hold between a given pro-form and its antecedent (or postcedent). In this respect, anaphors (reflexive and reciprocal pronouns) behave very differently from, for instance, personal pronouns.

== Complement anaphora ==
In some cases, anaphora may refer not to its usual antecedent, but to its complement set. In the following example a, the anaphoric pronoun they refers to the children who are eating the ice-cream. Contrastingly, example b has they seeming to refer to the children who are not eating ice-cream:

a. Only a few of the children ate their ice-cream. They ate the strawberry flavor first. – They meaning the children who ate ice-cream

b. Only a few of the children ate their ice-cream. They threw it around the room instead. – They meaning either the children who did not eat ice-cream or perhaps the children who did not eat ice-cream and some of those who ate ice-cream but did not finish it or who threw around the ice-cream of those who did not eat it, or even all the children, those who ate ice-cream throwing around part of their ice-cream, the ice-cream of others, the same ice-cream which they may have eaten before or after throwing it, or perhaps only some of the children so that they does not mean to be all-inclusive

In its narrower definition, an anaphoric pronoun must refer to some noun (phrase) that has already been introduced into the discourse. In complement anaphora cases, however, the anaphor refers to something that is not yet present in the discourse, since the pronoun's referent has not been formerly introduced, including the case of 'everything but' what has been introduced. The set of ice-cream-eating-children in example b is introduced into the discourse, but then the pronoun they refers to the set of non-ice-cream-eating-children, a set which has not been explicitly mentioned.

Both semantic and pragmatics considerations attend this phenomenon, which has followed discourse representation theory since the early 1980s. Similarly, generalized quantifier theory, was studied in a series of psycholinguistic experiments in the early 1990s. In complement anaphora as in the case of the pronoun in example b, this anaphora refers to some sort of complement set (i.e. only to the set of non-ice-cream-eating-children) or to the maximal set (i.e. to all the children, both ice-cream-eating-children and non-ice-cream-eating-children) or some hybrid or variant set, including potentially one of those noted to the right of example b. The various possible referents in complement anaphora are discussed Resolving complement anaphora is of interest in shedding light on brain access to information, calculation, mental modeling, communication.

== Anaphora resolution – centering theory ==
There are many theories that attempt to prove how anaphors are related and trace back to their antecedents, such as centering theory. Taking the computational theory of mind view of language, centering theory gives a computational analysis of underlying antecedents. Early theories proposed that some discourse entities in utterances are more "central" than others, and this degree of centrality imposes constraints on what can be the antecedent.

In the theory, there are different types of centers: forward facing, backwards facing, and preferred.

=== Forward facing centers ===
A ranked list of discourse entities in an utterance. The ranking is debated, some focusing on theta relations (Yıldırım et al. 2004) and some providing definitive lists.

=== Backwards facing center ===
The highest ranked discourse entity in the previous utterance.

=== Preferred center ===
The highest ranked discourse entity in the previous utterance realised in the current utterance.

== See also ==
- Antecedent – Expression that gives its meaning to a pro-form in grammar
- Binding – Distribution of anaphoric elements
- Coreference – Two or more expressions in a text with the same referent
- Donkey sentence – Sentence that resists simple formalization
- Endophora – Expressions that derive their reference from something within the surrounding text
- Exophora – Reference to something not in the immediate text
- Generic antecedent – Representatives of classes in a situation in which gender is typically unknown
- Logophoricity – Binding relation that may employ a morphologically different set of anaphoric forms
- Modal subordination – Formal semantic phenomenon – A phenomenon sometimes viewed as modal or temporal anaphora
- Pro-form – Word or form that substitutes for another word
