= Colognian phonology =

This article covers the phonology of modern Colognian as spoken in the city of Cologne. Varieties spoken outside of Cologne are only briefly covered where appropriate. Historic precedent versions are not considered.

There are slight pronunciation variations in Colognian which can be considered regional within the city, and some others seemingly more reflecting social status. The phonological impact of either is marginal.

Spelling of Colognian can follow several standards. Pronunciation variations are allowed to show as variant spellings in all of them. Because the spellings of single words may differ widely between systems, listing spellings in examples of phonological nature is not helpful. Thus, only IPA transcriptions are used here in examples.

Colognian is part of the Continental West Germanic dialect continuum. It is a central Ripuarian language. Ripuarian languages are related to Moselle Franconian and Limburgish. Local languages of all three groups are usually not understood at once by Colognian speakers, but comparatively easily learned.

Other languages almost always spoken by Colognian speakers today are the Rhinelandic and Standard varieties of German. Mixed language use is common today, so that in an average speakers awareness, Colognian lexemes are contrasting the two kinds of German ones as well.

Colognian has about 60 base phonemes and some 22 double consonants and diphthongs, depending on analysis.

== Consonants ==
With about 25 phonemes, the Colognian consonant system exhibits an average number of consonants in comparison with other languages. Notable differences with the enveloping German language are the absence of the fricative [ç] and the High German affricate /p͡f/. All Colognian consonants are pulmonic with the obvious exception of the glottal stop /ʔ/ which briefly interrupts the pulmonic air flow.

Consonant phonemes
		Labial	Alveolar	Post- alveolar		Palatal	Velar/ Uvular	Glottal
Nasal		m	n				ŋ	
Stop	voiceless	p	t				k	ʔ
Stop	voiced	b	d				ɡ	
Affricate	voiceless		t͡s	t͡ʃ				
Affricate	voiced			d͡ʒ				
Fricative	voiceless	f	s	ʃ	ɧ		x	h
Fricative	voiced	v	z	ʒ		ʝ~j	ʁ	
Approximant		v	l			ʝ~j	ʁ	

- For a number of speakers, syllable-initial /v/ has a number of realizations in free variation: [β], [ʋ], and [w].
- While Colognian has only one lateral phoneme /l/, it has a variety of allophonic realizations; coarticulation leads to the so-called "clear" L occasionally, but the "dark" ([ɫ]) or palatal ([ʎ]) variants are common in Colognian pronunciation. Arguably, [ʎ] is the most common. Retroflex ([ɭ]) or velar ([ʟ]) variants are also possible.
- The phoneme [ʁ] may be uvular or velar. Because it corresponds to rhotic phonemes in other dialects and languages, many transcription systems represent this as /r/, though this is phonetically incorrect as [r] does not appear in Colognian. Some Landkölsch varieties of Ripuarian spoken outside the city have [r], [ɾ] or [ʀ] instead of the Colognian /ʁ/ in certain positions, or throughout. Though often closely related, Colognian speakers consider these foreign sounds.
- Kölsch uses [ɧ], [ɕ] or even [ʃ] instead of [ç], that is used in Standard German, in words such as "ich".
- The /ɡ/ phoneme is pronounced [j] in the beginning of a word, and [ʝ], [ʁ], [ʀ], or [x] in other word positions, depending on the syllable structure.
- /x/ (which may also be a uvular [χ]) becomes voiced due to coarticulations or liaison:
  - [ˈnɔx] ('anymore') → [ˈnɔxˌʔən] → [ˈnɔɣ‿ən] ('another one').
- The phones [ʝ] and [j] are, for the most part, no longer distinguishable, though they were different phonemes in the past. Acoustic discrimination between [ʝ] and [j] appears nearly impossible. Though transcribed distinctly by one group of authors, there appears to be only one possible minimal pair; both words are rarely used and usually synonymous anyway:
  - [ʝʊt͡ʃ] ('downpour' m.)
  - [jʊt͡ʃ] ('willow reed' f.)
- /ɧ/ and /ʃ/ are different phonemes, which is shown by minimal pairs like [meɧ] ('me' dat.) and [meʃ] ('mix' imp.) or [ˈʝeːɧ] ('gout') and [ˈʝeːʃ] ('spray of waves'). Acoustic discrimination between [ɧ] and [ʃ] is sometimes difficult, coarticulation and assimilation may even cause them to overlap, but articulation generally differs. The Rheinische Dokumenta writing system does not distinguish between them, others most usually do.
  - The phoneme /ɧ/ exists only in the syllable coda It has the allophones [j], [ʝ], [ʒ] in certain positions occurring both with and without coarticulation. Whether the IPA symbol ⟨ɧ⟩ is a correct notation for the phone, is disputed.
  - The phoneme /ʃ/ has the allophone [ʒ] in certain environmental and prosodic circumstances.

The phoneme /ʃ/ has allophonic variations. Positional ones include [j], [ʝ], [ʒ]. Coarticulative variations cover a range from the standard English "light" [ʃ] to strongly velarized and/or pharyngealized versions. The average Colognian [ʃ] is "darker" and often spoken with the lips more protruded than English versions. Since the audible difference may be small despite different articulations, foreigners often confuse it with the phone [ɧ].

=== Terminal devoicing ===
Colognian, similar to German, Dutch, and other West Central German varieties, exhibits a phenomenon called terminal devoicing or Auslautverhärtung: in the word-final position, voiced consonant phonemes lose their voicing to become unvoiced. In the absence of liaisons and coarticulations, only the unvoiced, or fortis, variant is pronounced. For example, the words [zik] ('side') and [ˈziɡə] ('sides') have a stem-final /ɡ/. Consequentially, according to the Kölsch Akadamie orthographic rules, they are written as ⟨Sigg⟩ and ⟨Sigge⟩, respectively, while the more phonetic common, and Wrede, spellings write ⟨Sick⟩ and ⟨Sigge⟩, respectively.

=== Initial voicing ===
For the phoneme /s/ only, Colognian has initial voicing, quite like German has it. That means, /s/ never appears in word-initial position, only /z/ does. Where an unvoiced or fortis initial would be required, for instance in a word loaned from another language, /t͡s/ is used: [t͡sʊp] ('soup'), from Old French soupe, itself from Old High German supphan; or [ˈt͡sɔtiɐ²] ('sorting'), from the same word in Old Colognian, which borrowed it before 1581 from Old Italian sortire. Foreign words that are neologisms are usually adopted to Colognian phonotactic rules when pronounced; for instance the English computerese term server appears as [ˈzɜːvɐ] or [ˈzœ²vɐ] in most instances, or even [ˈzɛʁfɐ] among elderly speakers, at least.

== Vowels ==
	Front				Central	Back	
	unrounded		rounded		Central	Back	
	short	long	short	long	Central	short	long
Close	i	iː	y	yː		u	uː
Near-close	ɪ		ʏ			ʊ	
Close-mid	e	eː	ø	øː	ə	o	oː
Open-mid	ɛ	ɛː	œ	œː	ɐ	ɔ	ɔː
Open					a aː		

- There are also two semivowels: [ɐ̯] and [ɔ̯], the latter of which is not phonemic.

Diphthongs are /aɪ, aːʊ, aʊ, eɪ, iɐ̯, oʊ, ɔʏ, øʏ/. /aːʊ/ only occurs with Stoßton.

== Tone ==
Colognian and other Ripuarian dialects have two pitch accents, commonly called 'Accent 1' and 'Accent 2'. The distinction occurs on stressed heavy syllables. Accent 1 is the marked tone, while Accent 2 is the default. Accent 1 has a falling pitch in the city of Cologne, though the realizations of the two tones differ elsewhere.

The terminology for the two tones can be somewhat confusing. Following are the German and (in italics) Dutch terminology.

Accent 1	Accent 2
Tonakzent 1 (T1)	Tonakzent 2 (T2)
Schärfung (+Schärfung)	(−Schärfung)
geschärft (+geschärft)	ungeschärft (−geschärft)
Stoßton	Schleifton
stoottoon	sleeptoon
hoge toon	valtoon
accent 1	accent 2

(Note that the Dutch hoge toon "high tone" and valtoon "falling tone" are descriptive only, and not consistent between varieties of Ripuarian. They would be misnomers for Colognian.)

Accent 1 (T1) can only occur on stressed, heavy syllables: that is, syllables with long vowels, diphthongs, or a short vowel followed by a sonorant (/m, n, ŋ, r, l/). Minimal pairs include T2 /ʃtiːf/ "stiff, rigid" vs. T1 /ʃtîːf/ "stiffness, rigidity; starch", /huːs/ "house (nom./acc.)" vs. /hûːs/ "house (dat.)", /ʃlɛːʃ/ "bad" vs. /ʃlɛ̂ːʃ/ "beats, blows, strikes (n. pl.)" with long vowels, /zei/ "she" vs. /zêi/ "sieve" with a diphthong, and /kan/ "(I/he) can" vs. /kân/ "(tea)pot, jug" with a short vowel plus sonorant.

== See also ==
- Colognian grammar
- Kerkrade dialect phonology
