= Colognian idioms =

An expression in a language is considered an idiom when its commonly understood figurative meaning is separate from its literal meaning. Colognian has idioms, and they are as frequent as in all central European languages. Many coincide with idioms of the languages close to Colognian, such as Dutch, Limburgish, Low German, and High German, or with other Ripuarian varieties, but quite many are also unique to Colognian.

== Examples ==
These sentences contain idiomatic expressions. Parts not to be taken literally are bolded.

- "Dä Jäk **hät** doch en **Ääz am wandere**." - This individual is somewhat off his or her track. He/she is mad. (Literal meaning: … has a walking pea.)
- "Nu donn einer ens **Boter bei de Fesch**." - Someone (of you) must become real now! Tell us clearly now! Give us all the details and background information now! (Literal meaning: … butter to the fish.) This is also quite common in Dutch, Flemish, and the entire North of Germany.
- "Kumm, **lohß jonn!**" - Start (now)! Ignite! Get off! It resembles the English colloquial Come on! as an edge case but is usually stronger and more imperative. (Literally: Come and let go.)
- "**Lohß** dat **noh Holland jonn**." - Give (it) up. Give up on it. Do not cling to it. Do not care any more. Let it (e.g. your sorrow) go. (Literally: Let it go to Holland, let it to the Netherlands, down the stream.) This is a figurative expression, too. If something happened to fall into the river Rhine, it was bound to drift down towards Holland, and usually could not, and cannot, be rescued in Cologne due to the high current of the Rhine at the city center side.
- "Joh, nu simmer **lahns Schmitz Bakes**." - Now we are safe. (Literally: … behind, or having passed, the Smith's Bakery.) Also commonly used elsewhere in the Rhineland.
- "Ouh, doh bes De ävver **fies ob_et Föttsche jevalle**." - Ouch, something really went wrong for you. (Literally: You unpleasantly fell on your small ass.)
- "Bei dänne jeihd_et zoh, wi **beim hellije Fott-Annenieß**." - These people are stiff and quite formal on their behavioral surface. There is a connotation of "could be, only their surface", but that is not necessarily meant or implied always. (Literally: At their place, everything is going on as/like at/with the holy Ass Agnes.)
- "Jähje dä **kanns De enpacke**." - In comparison with, or when going against, this person, you are chanceless. (Literal meaning: … you can pack. (like in: packing one's suitcase, and leave.))
- "Jung, do wells mer doch jäz kei **Uhr afkeue**?" - Man, you are not going to start an endless nagging-type of talk to me, are yo? (Literally: … chew one's ear off.)
- "Pass_op, dat es ene **drüjje Pitter**." Be aware: you are very unlikely to make him laugh or show his compassion or emotions. (Literally: Be aware, he is a dry Peter.) There is also a well colloquially named dry Peter in Cologne, near the Cologne Cathedral.

== See also ==
- Colognian proverbial expressions
- Colognian grammar
