= Colognian proverbial expressions =

A proverb in a language is a simple sentence, phrase, or occasionally phrasal expression that is commonly used so as to refer to a well known maxim, narrative, or short termed wisdom. Proverbs are often metaphorical. Proverbial expressions use parts of proverbs or full proverbs in order to refer to their meaning or basic essence in a way understood similar to a reference without complete recitation.

Colognian has a set of proverbs. Many of them can be used in proverbial expressions. They often function similar to idioms inside sentences without really being ones. They can also be used standalone, or as complete entities in dialogs. For example, someone missed something because he was not informed and says: Wä et hät jewoß… (Who had known it…) and gets an answer: Wä et hät jedonn. (Who had done it.) in exchange. (See below for an explanation.)

== Examples ==
- Bei ons en der Schtrohß hädd_enne affrekahnesche Lahde opjemaht … un noh drei Woche widder zoh. Woröm? Joh, wat der Buur nit kännt. (An African shop opened in our street … and closed three weeks later. Why? What the farmer does not know.) - The proverb: Wat der Buur nit kännt, dat freß hä nit. (The farmer does not eat what he does not know.) hints that conservative people, and people of lesser education, are unlikely to experiment or try the unknown. Hence an African shop in a residential area of non-Africans is unsuccessful.
- Wi'sch jehoot han, wat onse Börjermeister övver et Klüngele jesaat hät, ha'sch bei mer jedaach, wä em Jlahshuus sez, ne. (Having heard our mayor talk about corruption, I thought: He, who lives in a glass house, isn't it so?) - A proverb "Those who live in glass houses should not throw stones." exists in Colognian as well as in English and conveys the same meaning. The speaker refers to it so as to indirectly voice his belief that the mayor or his office are involved in corruption, too, despite what the mayor said.
- Woh der Düüvel hen driiß: Der Fleischouer hädd_ene Mäzehdes jewunne. (Where the devil shits to: Mr. Fleischhauer [a millionaire car dealer] won a Mercedes-Benz [in the lottery].) - The proverb Der Düüvel driiß emmer op der jrühßte Houfe (The devil always shits on the biggest pile.) refers to the observation that wealthy people tend to get richer and richer, while poor ones do not, and attributes the perceived injustice of it to the devil.
- The phrase pair Wä et hät jedonn. (Who had done it.) and Wä et hät jewoß… (Who had known it…) refer to the well known narrative of a couple who did not marry because she felt they were too poor. He left the city to come back after years as a rich and well respected duke. When they met in the market where she was selling cheap pottery, the beforementioned dialogue happened.
- The sentence Jäk lohß Jäke lahns. (Fool, let fools pass [by].) is often cited as a reminder on various occasions - from the wish not be too concerned with a specific persons snobbish, impatient, or inconsiderate behavior, to the gentle hint that the addressed person could be seen so by others, and many more.

== See also ==
- Colognian idioms
- Colognian grammar

== Sources ==
- Rolly Brings, Christa Bhatt: Lück sin och Minsche. Enzyklopädie der Kölner Redensarten. Akademie för uns kölsche Sproch der SK Stiftung Kultur (editor), 2008.
