= Colognian =

Colognian may refer to:

- Something of, from, or related to the city of Cologne in North Rhine-Westphalia, Germany
- Colognian dialect, a Ripuarian dialect spoken in Cologne
