= Dokumenta =

Dokumenta may mean:

- the Rheinische Dokumenta, a phonetic writing system of West German Platt languages
- Documenta, a modern art exhibition held in Kassel, Germany every 5 years, as per a common misspelling
- Documents, in various languages
