= Rheinische Dokumenta =

Rhenish phonetic writing system

The Rheinische Dokumenta (German pronunciation: [ˈʁaɪnɪʃə dokuˈmɛnta]) is a phonetic writing system developed in the early 1980s by a working group of academics, linguists, local language experts, and local language speakers of the Rhineland. It was presented to the public in 1986 by the Landschaftsverband Rheinland.

It offers a uniform common notation of almost every phoneme spoken in the Lower Rhine area, the western and central Rhineland, the Berg region, the Westerwald, Eifel, and Hunsrück mountain regions, plus the areas surrounding the Nahe and Moselle Rivers. It encompasses the dialects of cities such as Aachen, Bingen, Bonn, Cologne, Duisburg, Düsseldorf, Eschweiler and Eschweiler, Essen, Eupen, Gennep, Gummersbach, Heinsberg, Karlsruhe, Kaiserslautern, Kerkrade and Herzogenrath, Cleves, Koblenz, Limburg, Ludwigshafen, Luxembourg, Maastricht, Mainz, Malmedy, Mönchengladbach, Nijmegen, Oberhausen, Prüm, Raeren, Saarbrücken, Siegen, Trier, Venlo, St. Vith, Wiesbaden, Wipperfürth, Wuppertal, Xanten, and many more.

Rheinische Dokumenta was designed to be easily readable for dialect speakers educated in German writing, but there are some differences that make it quite distinct from the usual ways of writing the dialects: There is no doubling of consonants to mark short vowels, and there are extra diacritical marks. The German letters ⟨z⟩ and ⟨x⟩ are spelled ⟨ts⟩ and ⟨ks⟩, German ⟨ch⟩ is spelled ⟨k⟩ when it indicates a /k/ pronunciation, German ⟨qu⟩ is spelled ⟨kw⟩. These spellings appear in other Germanic languages as well, but Rhinelanders are generally not accustomed to them.

== Letters ==
The Rheinische Dokumenta uses the letters of today's ISO basic Latin alphabet, without ⟨c⟩, ⟨q⟩, ⟨x⟩, ⟨y⟩, ⟨z⟩, though it has the digraphs ⟨ch⟩, ⟨c͜h⟩, ⟨ng⟩, trigraph ⟨sch⟩. In addition, the three common German umlauted letters are used: ⟨ä⟩, ⟨ö⟩, ⟨ü⟩, and ten more letters, digraphs, and a trigraph, each having diacritical marks:

ạ ą̈ c͜h e̩ ǫ ǫ̈ ṛ ṣ s͜ch

Each letter, digraph, or trigraph is strictly representing one phone. Most letters represent the usual sounds for which they are used in the German alphabet or, slightly less so, in the Dutch alphabet or that of the Luxembourgish language. Several letters are ambiguous in these languages, such as voiced consonants which lose their voice when appearing at the end of a word. These ambiguities are avoided writing Rheinische Dokumenta; despite the fact that word stems may change their printed appearance, when declined or conjugated, always the most phonetically correct letters, digraphs, or trigraphs are being used.

=== Digraph and trigraph unambiguity ===
As opposed to Dutch, the combination of ⟨s⟩ followed by ⟨ch⟩ does not occur in the languages for which Rheinische Dokumenta was made. Thus, since ⟨c⟩ is not otherwise used in Rheinische Dokumenta, both ⟨ch⟩ and ⟨sch⟩ are unambiguous, especially the underlined letter combinations, and the ones having an arch below.

Only the digraph ⟨ng⟩ has some ambiguity. An ⟨n⟩ may occur at the end of a syllable, but only a few dialects allow a syllable initial (g) after a syllable final ⟨n⟩. While ⟨ng⟩ at syllable joints is frequent in German, most languages that can use Rheinische Dokumenta have ⟨mg⟩ or ⟨nj⟩ instead in almost all instances. The authors of Rheinische Dokumenta suggest using the single letter eng ⟨ŋ⟩ instead of the digraph ⟨ng⟩ when possible.

=== Letter case ===
Though not defined in the original specification, upper case letters can be used. While some authors do not use them at all, others start sentences with capitals or capitalise names, and few use capital initial letters on each substantive and noun, as standard German writing does.

== Accents ==
Stress and the tonal accents are usually ignored when writing in Rheinische Dokumenta. There are diacritics to indicate them, but since they considerably hamper readability, convolute printing, and are typically not necessary to facilitate understanding, they are seldom used. Many dialects also lack tonal accents, but for those that do, there are only a very few word pairs or triplets having identical unaccented Rheinische Dokumenta spellings but different tonal or stress accents.

Also, other prosody, such as the "melody" of sentence, which carries semantic information in many Rheinisch languages, is not preserved in Rheinische Dokumenta writing.

== Vowels ==
Vowels come in two variants, short and long. That many dialects feature three distinct vowel lengths is ignored, as doing so does not create any ambiguities and makes reading easier. Short vowels are represented by single letters, long vowels are represented by the same letters doubled to indicate lengthening.

=== Monophthongs ===
Rheinische Dokumenta can write 25 monophthongs.

==== Short monophthongs ====
There are 14 short vowels in the languages that the script was designed for, 13 of which are representable in Rheinische Dokumenta:

Letter	IPA	Sample word	Rheinische Dokumenta	Unicode
A, a	[a], [ɐ], [ʌ]	English "bud", "but", "butt"	bat	U+0041, U+0061
Ạ, ạ	[ɑ], [ʌ]	American English "column"	kạle̩m	U+1EA0, U+1EA1
Ä, ä	[ɛ]	English "where", "ware"	wäe̩	U+00C4, U+00E4
Ą̈, ą̈	[æ]	English "batch"	bą̈tsch	
E, e	[e]	English "bet"	bet	U+0045, U+0065
E̩, e̩ ə	[ə]	English article "a" when unstressed	e̩	U+0045+0329, U+0065+0329; U+0259
I, i	[i], [ɪ]	English "spit"	spit	U+0049, U+0069
O, o	[o], [ʊ]	French "Cologne"	kolǫnje̩	U+004F, U+006F
Ǫ, ǫ	[ɔ]	English word "off"	ǫf	U+01EA, U+01EB
Ö, ö	[ø]	Kölsch word "Köt" (cutaway)	köt	U+00D6, U+00F6
Ǫ̈, ǫ̈	[œ]	German pronunciation of "Cologne": "Köln"	Kǫ̈ln	
U, u	[ʊ], [u]	English verb, to "put"	put	U+0055, U+0075
Ü, ü	[y], [ʏ]	French "rue" (street)	rü	U+00DC, U+00FC

The "e̩" is [ə], a schwa. There is no long version of "e̩". Although a schwa usually cannot carry word accent or stress, in some dialects there are exceptions. Words having only schwas do have their stress on schwas, and they can receive the main stress within a sentence as well. The Colognian word "e̩ns" (in Rheinische Dokumenta writing) is an example.

===== The schwa "e̩r" =====
There is another schwa. It does not have a corresponding grapheme in Rheinische Dokumenta. It could be noted in IPA as an unstressed short [ɔ̆], in some dialects and positions also as an unstressed short [ɐ̆]. Some publications call it a "vocalic r". It is almost always followed by a glottal stop. Glottal stops are not noted in Rheinische Dokumenta, even though they are phonemes occasionally having minimal pairs and a length attribute. Since this schwa almost always corresponds to the digraph "er" ending a word or a separable syllable prefix of Standard German orthography, most users of Rheinische Dokumenta positionally print "er", or "e̩r", respectively, for increased readability in an attempt of courtesy towards their readers who read German more fluently than Rheinische Dokumenta. From the standpoint of phonological writing, this is incorrect.

==== Long monophthongs ====
There are 12 long vowels. For each short vowel with the exception of the schwa "e̩", there is a corresponding long vowel:

Letter	IPA	Sample Word	Rheinische Dokumenta
Aa, aa	[aː], [ɐː], [ʌː]	Kölsch "Aap":	Aap
Ạạ, ạạ	[ɑː], [ʌː]	British English "Argument":	Ạạgjume̩nt
Ää, ää	[ɛː]	Kölsch "Wääsh":	Vääsch
Ą̈ą̈, ą̈ą̈	[æː]	Australian English "Mad":	Mą̈ą̈d
Ee, ee	[eː]	German "Esel" (donkey):	eeṣe̩l
Ii, ii	[iː], [ɪː]	English "speed":	spiit
Ii, ii	[iː], [ɪː]	English "meal":	miil
Oo, oo	[oː], [ʊː]	French "Eau de Cologne":	oode̩ kolǫnje̩
Ǫǫ, ǫǫ	[ɔː]	British English "door":	dǫǫ
Öö, öö	[øː]	Horst Köhler's surname:	Kööle̩r (see above remark on the digraph "e̩r")
Ǫ̈ǫ̈, ǫ̈ǫ̈	[œː]	English "stern":	stǫ̈ǫ̈n
Ǫ̈ǫ̈, ǫ̈ǫ̈	[œː]	British English "burger":	bǫ̈ǫ̈ge̩
Ǫ̈ǫ̈, ǫ̈ǫ̈	[œː]	English "colonel":	kǫ̈ǫ̈nl, kǫ̈ǫ̈ne̩l
Uu, uu	[ʊː], [uː]	English "boot":	buut
Üü, üü	[yː], [ʏː]	Ruud Krol's first name:	Rüüt (In Dutch, this name has a short vowel, but this is a usual Rhineländisch pronunciation)

=== Diphthongs ===
In Rheinische Dokumenta, diphthongs are simply denoted as a sequence of the two monophthongs heard and spoken jointly. For instance, the English word "boy" would be spelled: "bǫi" in Rheinische Dokumenta. There are occasions, when two monophthongs need to be written together without forming a diphthong; that means they are pronounced separately with either a glottal stop or an intervocalic joiner consonant "j" in between. There is no written distinction between these cases, although it is not forbidden to write the character "j" for clarity. The number of diphthongs existing in a dialect is far less than each possible combination of two vowels, thus there are not very many ambiguities when taking syllable structure into account.

Assimilation and coarticulation are predominant in most of the languages written using Rheinische Dokumenta, thus diphthong articulation may deviate somewhat from the articulation of the isolated monophthongs. Also, depending on languages, the lengths of their diphthongs may vary considerably between the extremes of as short as a typical short monophthong to longer than the sum of two long monophthongs. Varying lengths of diphthongs are not noted in Rheinische Dokumenta, which at least does not create ambiguities within a dialect.

=== Other ===
There are no triphthongs, although diphthongs can be followed by schwas in some languages. If, for instance, Rheinische Dokumenta was used in writing Westphalian, triphthongs would be written in a manner analogous to the diphthongs, using three adjacent letters of vocals.

== Consonants ==
Since most dialects follow the German, and Lower Franconian, rule of final-obstruent devoicing, voiced consonants cannot, or hardly ever, appear at the end of a word or sentence. This is one of the major differences between Rheinische Dokumenta and Standard German writing, since Standard German orthography tries to keep word stems unaltered, even if pronunciation varies with suffixes, endings, or phonological rules. If there is assimilation or other sandhi across word boundaries which yields a consonant voiced at a word end, some authors write them as contractions or join the words with a dash "-" to avoid having final voiced consonants.

=== Unvoiced plosives ===
Letter	IPA	Sample Word	Rheinische Dokumenta	Unicode
P, p	[p]	English "pitch":	pitsch	U+0050, U+0070
T, t	[t]	English "tell":	täl	U+0054, U+0074
K, k	[k]	New England American English "colt":	kǫlt	U+004B, U+006B

=== Voiced plosives ===
Letter	IPA	Sample Word	Rheinische Dokumenta	Unicode
B, b	[b]	English "bee":	bii	U+0042, U+0062
D, d	[d]	English "dull":	dal	U+0044, U+0064
G, g	[ɡ]	English "guts":	gats	U+0047, U+0067

=== Nasals ===
Though some dialects vary the duration of nasal consonants considerably, they are not doubled to indicate extended length when written, while vocals are. Though this never creates ambiguities within a language, comparison of languages is less supported. A good argument against doubling is that often nasal durations depend on speaker, style of speech, and prosody rather than being a characteristic of a word or a dialect, although that is not always so.

Letter	IPA	Sample Word	Rheinische Dokumenta	Unicode
M, m	[m]	English "moon":	muun	U+004D, U+006D
N, n	[n]	English "new":	njuu	U+004E, U+006E
NG, ng Ŋ, ŋ	[ŋ]	English "long":	lǫng	U+004E+0047, U+006E+0067; U+014B, U+014A

The letter eng (ŋ) is recommended rather than the ng digraph when technically feasible. This recommendation is not always followed in an attempt to create prints closer resembling Standard German or Dutch. Though the phoneme cannot appear at the beginning of a syllable, upper case glyphs exist for all caps and small caps print.

=== Liquids or approximants ===
Some dialects vary the duration of liquids. With the exception of Ripuarian dialects, this is hardly a characteristic of words, but prosodic. It is not noted when writing Rheinische Dokumenta.

Letter	IPA	Sample Word	Rheinische Dokumenta	Unicode
L, l	[l], [ʎ]	English "law":	lǫǫ	U+004C, U+006C
R, r	[ʁ], [ʀ]	French "rue" (street):	rüü	U+0052, U+0072
Ṙ, ṙ
Ṛ, ṛ				U+0052+0323, U+0072+0323
W, w	[w], [β]	English "wall":	wǫǫl	U+0057, U+0077
H, h	[h]	English "hell":	häl	U+0048, U+0068

There is no distinction between the different phones represented by l, and r. They are nearly allophones; most often a specific dialect uses one, but not the other phone of a pair.

Both ṛ, and ṙ, are rarely used since these sounds occur in only a few dialects.

=== Voiced fricatives ===
Letter	IPA	Sample Word	Rheinische Dokumenta	Unicode
V, v	[v]	English "vice":	vais	U+0076, U+0056
Ṣ, ṣ Z, z	[z]	English "zeal":	ṣiil	U+0053+0323, U+0073+0323; U+005A, U+007A
S︧C︭H︨, S︧c︭h︨, s︧c︭h︨	[ʒ]	English "jet":	ds︧c︭h︨ät	U+0073+FE27+0063+FE2D+0068+FE28
J, j	[ʝ]	English "yet":	jät	U+004A, U+006A
C͜H, C͜h, c͜h	[ɣ]	Dutch "goed" (good):	c͜huut	U+0063+035C+0068

The letter z is recommended to be used as a replacement of ṣ, when ṣ is technically not available. This resembles the use of z in Dutch writing.

=== Unvoiced fricatives ===
Letter	IPA	Sample Word	Rheinische Dokumenta	Unicode
F, f	[f]	English "fish":	fisch	U+0066, U+0046
S, s	[s]	English "sick":	sik	U+0053, U+0073
Sch, / sch; SCH, / sch	[ʃ]	English "shut":	schat	U+0053+0063+0068, / U+0073-0063+0068; U+0053-0043+0048, / U+0073-0063+0068
C̲h̲, / c̲h̲; C̲H̲, / c̲h̲	[ç]	German "mich" (me, myself):	mic̲h̲	U+0043+0332+0048+0332, U+0063++0068+
Ch, / ch; CH, / ch	[x]	German "Dach" (roof):	dach	U+0043+0068, / U+0063+0068; U+0043+0048, / U+0063+0068

The variations Sch, and Ch, are used for title case, while SCH, and CH, are used for all caps and small caps.

Few West- and Central Ripuarian languages, most notably Colognian, have the non-allophones [ʃ] and [ɧ] Both are written sch in Rheinische Dokumenta. The associated phones are to a large extent positionally distinguishable and clearly articulated differently. Nevertheless they are acoustically hard to distinguish, in part due to coarticulation, at times even for natives. So the designers of Rheinische Dokumenta choose to consider their differentiation unnecessary or marginal.

== Typographical considerations ==
Rheinische Dokumenta has several diacritical marks, some of which have their typographical peculiarities.

Umlauts can be seen as their counterparts in German, or Latin script, typography.

The "central hook below", which is being used to denote openness of the vowels ą̈, ǫ, ǫ̈. respectively, could be confused with the ogonek. In fact, it is different. While the ogonek is to be placed somewhat off the optical center of the glyph it goes with, the Rheinische Dokumenta hook explicitly goes to its center. Thus it gives another impression and does not resemble the ogonek. Most Rheinische Dokumenta prints choose it to be slightly more angular, longer, and thus appear bolder than ogoneks usually are.

The "center dot below" may not always be available. Using z as a replacement for ṣ is recommended in such cases, resembling Dutch writing. There are no such replacements or recommendations for the letters ạ, and ṛ, respectively, which are comparatively much less used.

When the "horizontal bar below" is not available, using the glyph ə as a replacement for e̩, when possible, is recommended in such cases.

The phoneme denoted by ŋ in print, alternately spelt ng, never appears at the beginning of a syllable, word, or sentence. Yet its upper case version could be used in all caps or small caps type.

The two variations of sch, and the three variations of ch, when written in title case, usually have only their 1st character uppercased, when used in all caps or small caps, however, each letter is converted to upper case.

== Unicode ==
Rheinische Dokumenta cannot currently be fully written in Unicode but proposals are underway to have missing pieces added.

Rheinische Dokumenta is part of the Latin character set of Unicode, and thus part of its Basic Multilingual Plane (Unicode). It is to a large extent covered by single code points. While unaccented characters do that anyway, even some of the characters having diacritical marks nevertheless occupy only one character position in a text stream in their normalized form.
