= Enem =

Enem may refer to:

- Enem (urban-type settlement), an urban-type settlement in Takhtamukaysky District of the Republic of Adygea, Russia
- Exame Nacional do Ensino Médio (Enem), a high-school exam in Brazil
- Colognian language's declension has enem as a form of an indefinite article
