= Kerkrade dialect phonology =

This article covers the phonology of the Kerkrade dialect, a West Ripuarian language variety spoken in parts of the Kerkrade municipality in the Netherlands (including the town of Kerkrade itself) and Herzogenrath in Germany.

Just like Colognian, the Kerkrade dialect is not uniform and there are some geographical differences. This article focuses on the variety spoken in the Dutch town of Kerkrade.

== Consonants ==
In contrast to Limburgish and Standard Dutch, but like other varieties of Ripuarian, the Kerkrade dialect was partially affected by the High German consonant shift. For instance, the former /t/ became an affricate /ts/ in word-initial and word-final positions, after historical /l/ and /r/ as well as when doubled. Thus, the word for "two" is twee /ˈtʋeː/ in Standard Dutch, but tswai /ˈtsβaɪ/ in the Kerkrade dialect, almost identical to Standard German zwei /ˈtsvaɪ/.

		Labial	Alveolar	Palatal (-alveolar)	Dorsal	Glottal
Nasal		m	n		ŋ	
Plosive	voiceless	p	t		k	
Plosive	voiced	b	d		(ɡ)	
Affricate	voiceless		ts	tʃ		
Affricate	voiced		(dz)	(dʒ)		
Fricative	voiceless	f	s	ʃ	x	
Fricative	voiced	v	z	ʒ	ɣ	ɦ
Sonorant		β	l	j	ʁ	

- The Kerkrade dialect features final-obstruent devoicing, which means that the underlying /b, d, ɡ, v, z, ʒ, ɣ/ are devoiced to [p, t, k, f, s, ʃ, χ ~ ç] at the end of a word. /dz/ is not affected by this as it occurs only in a few words (such as ködzele /ˈkœdzələ/ 'to drool') and only between vowels. This mirrors the situation in Luxembourgish.
- /dʒ/ occurs only in the intervocalic position.
- Stem-final /b, d, ɡ, v, z, ʒ, ɣ/ are realized as voiced before the plural markers /-ə/ and /-ər/: rub [ˈʁøp] - rubbe [ˈʁøbə], vroag [ˈvʁoəχ] 'question' - vroage [ˈvʁoəʁə] 'questions', wief [ˈβiːf] - wiever [ˈβiːvəʁ], or in verbal conjugation (iech loog [ˈloːχ] - ze loge [ˈlóːʁə]). The voiced [ɡ] appears only in these contexts, typically following a short vowel.
- /ɣ/ has two voiced allophones: a uvular fricative [ʁ], which appears after back vowels, and a palatal approximant [j], which occurs after front vowels. They are devoiced to [χ] and [ç] in the word-final position. Phonetically, the voiced variants are the same as /ʁ/ and /j/, which are phonological sonorants (and thus cannot participate in final-obstruent devoicing), whereas the voiceless variants are the same as the allophones of /x/. Thus, the plural form zeëje [ˈzeəjə] 'saws' has an underlying /ɣ/: /ˈzeəɣə/ because it alternates with a voiceless fricative in the stem zeëg [ˈzeəç] 'saw', phonemically /ˈzeəɣ/. Compare this with the vroag - vroage alternation mentioned before, or with the plural-singular pair löcher [ˈlœçəʁ] - laoch [ˈlɔːχ], with underlying voiceless fricatives: /ˈlœxər, ˈlɔːx/.
- /m, p, b, β/ are bilabial, whereas /f, v/ are labiodental.
- The voiceless plosives /p, t, k/ are unaspirated, which is their typical Ripuarian realization.
- Syllable-final /l/ tends to be velarized, especially after /a/. It can also be velarized intervocalically after /a/.
- After phonological back vowels, /x, ɣ/ are uvular [χ, ʁ], which is reflected in the way they are transcribed in this article. After front vowels (and consonants, in the case of /x/) they are realized as palatal [ç, j]. The voiced allophones of /ɣ/ are phonetically indistinguishable from /ʁ/ and /j/. Most instances of the historical /ɣ/ are realized as [j], also in the word-initial position (where it is analyzed as /j/ in this article), as in jreun /ˈjrøːn/ 'green' (cf. Standard Dutch groen /ˈɣrun/). The consonants surrounding the diphthong in vroage /ˈvroəɣə/ 'questions' are indistinguishable from each other: [ˈvʁoəʁə]. This is an example of rhotacism and it is a typical Ripuarian feature.

== Vowels ==
Vowel phonemes
		Front				Central	Back	
		unrounded		rounded		Central	Back	
		short	long	short	long	short	short	long
Close		i	iː	y	yː		u	uː
Close-mid		e	eː	ø	øː	ə	o	oː
Open-mid		ɛ	ɛː	œ	œː	ə	ɔ	ɔː
Open							a	aː
Diphthongs	closing	ɛɪ œʏ ɔɪ ɔʊ aɪ aʊ						
Diphthongs	centering	iə yə uə eə œə oə						

- The long /iː, uː/ contrast with the short /i, u/ only in stressed syllables. In unstressed syllables, only the short /i, u/ appear.
- Many words that have the long rounded close-mid vowels /øː/ and /oː/ in the neighboring Limburgish dialects have the short /ø/ and /o/ in Kerkrade - compare Limburgish good /ɣoːd/ with Kerkrade jód /jod/, both meaning 'good'.
- /ø, øː, œ, œː/ can be considered the umlauted variants of /o, oː, ɔ, ɔː/.
- /ə/ occurs only in unstressed syllables. It is also inserted in the historical consonant clusters of /l/ or /r/ followed by a labial or a velar consonant, as in helpe /ˈɦɛləpə/ and sjterk /ˈʃtɛrək/.
- /oə/ is the only centering diphthong that can occur before /r/. The functional load of the /oə–oː/ contrast in this position is unclear.

=== Phonetic realization ===
- Among the short front unrounded vowels, /i/ is close [i], /e/ is near-close [ɪ], whereas /ɛ/ is mid [ɛ̝]. Before /m, n, ŋ, l, r/, the last two are lowered to [e] and [æ], respectively. In this article, only the allophony of /ɛ/ is marked in phonetic transcription. This means that phonetically, the rounded counterpart of the short /e/ is /y/, as both are normally near-close, whereas /ø/ and /i/ are unpaired. In addition, /y/ is unique among the stressable short vowels in that it can appear in the word-final position outside of function words, which makes it a free vowel like Standard Dutch /y/.
- The phonetic distance between /y/ and /ø/ is not very great; the former is near-close [ʏ] (like Standard Dutch ⟨uu⟩), whereas the latter is close-mid central [ɵ] (like Standard Dutch ⟨u⟩), much as in the Limburgish dialect of Hamont. Phonetically speaking, this makes /ø/ nothing more than a stressable counterpart of /ə/, although the two are phonologically distinct - just as in Standard Dutch. Word-final instances of /y/ are realized as a fully close vowel [y].
- Both /a/ and /aː/ are phonological back vowels, but only the short /a/ is phonetically back: [ɑ]. The long /aː/ is phonetically central [äː] (hereafter represented without the diacritic).
- Before /r/, all of the long vowels are pronounced even longer than in Standard Dutch. In this position, the long /iː, yː, uː, eː, øː/ are realized with a slight schwa offglide [iːːə̯, yːːə̯, uːːə̯, eːːə̯, øːːə̯], which means that they approach the centering diphthongs /iə, yə, uə, eə, œə/, though the latter have a shorter first element (in addition to the lower starting point of /œə/). The remaining /oː/ and /aː/ are just elongated [oːː, aːː] without diphthongization in this position. The vowels are diphthongized and/or elongated even before intervocalic /r/, as in bedoere [bəˈduːːə̯ʁə]. This allophony does not occur before the underlying /ɣ/, which means that it is differentiated from /r/ after /uː, oː, aː/ by the length of the preceding vowel (which is shorter before /ɣ/) and the lack of diphthongization of /uː/ before /ɣ/. It is unclear whether those differences are consistently maintained.

== Pitch accent ==
As most other Ripuarian and Limburgish dialects, the Kerkrade dialect features a distinction between the thrusting tone (Dutch: stoottoon, German: Schärfung or Stoßton), which has a shortening effect on the syllable (not shown in transcriptions in this article) and the slurring tone (Dutch: sleeptoon, German: Schleifton). This distinctive pitch accent appears on long vowels as well as short vowels followed by a sonorant. In this article, the slurring tone is transcribed as a high tone, whereas the thrusting tone is left unmarked. This is nothing more than a convention, as the phonetics of the Kerkrade pitch accent are severely under-researched. There are minimal pairs, for example moer /ˈmuːr/ 'wall' - moer /ˈmúːr/ 'carrot'.

The pitch accent can be the only difference:

- Between words differentiated only by gender, as in the minimal pair de val /də ˈval/ - d'r val /dər ˈvál/
- Between the plural and singular, as in the minimal pair de peëd /də ˈpeət/ - 't peëd /ət ˈpéət/.
  - This is sometimes reinforced by other differences, e.g. de knieng /də ˈkniːŋ/ - d'r knien /dər ˈkníːn/. Some words have two possible plural forms, one that is differentiated from the singular form only by tone and a more distinct one; compare de boom /də ˈboːm/ with the umlauted de beum /də ˈbøːm/, which are plural forms of d'r boom /dər ˈbóːm/.
- Between inflected and uninflected forms of adjectives, compare rónge /ˈroŋə/ with rónk /ˈróŋk/.
- Between the diminutive and the primitive form.

== See also ==
- Colognian phonology

== Bibliography ==
- Bodelier, Jorina (2011). Tone and intonation in the Lemiers dialect of Ripuarian (MA General Linguistics Thesis). Amsterdam: University of Amsterdam.
- Russ, Charles V.J. (1989). The dialects of Modern German: A Linguistic survey. Routledge. ISBN 978-0-415-00308-7.
- Stichting Kirchröadsjer Dieksiejoneer (1997) [1987]. Kirchröadsjer Dieksiejoneer (in Dutch) (2nd ed.). Kerkrade: Stichting Kirchröadsjer Dieksiejoneer. ISBN 90-70246-34-1.
- Verhoeven, Jo (2007). "The Belgian Limburg dialect of Hamont". Journal of the International Phonetic Association. 37 (2): 219–225. doi:10.1017/S0025100307002940.
