= Voiceless uvular fricative =

Consonantal sound represented by ⟨χ⟩ in IPA

χ

ꭓ
- IPA number: 142

Audio sample
- source · help

Encoding
- Entity (decimal): &#967;
- Unicode (hex): U+03C7
- X-SAMPA: X
- Braille: ⠨ (braille pattern dots-46) ⠯ (braille pattern dots-12346)
Image

A voiceless uvular fricative is a type of consonantal sound that is used in some spoken languages. The symbol in the International Phonetic Alphabet that represents this sound is either a Latin or Greek-style chi, ⟨χ⟩. This sound was historically represented in the IPA with ⟨ᴚ⟩, a turned small capital R, until 1928, when it was officially changed to ⟨χ⟩. In Americanist phonetic notation the sound is represented by ⟨x̣⟩ (ex with underdot), or sometimes by ⟨x̌⟩ (ex with caron). In broad transcription it may be transcribed ⟨x⟩, or ⟨r⟩ if rhotic.

Many languages claimed to have a voiceless uvular fricative may actually have a voiceless uvular fricative trill.

== Features ==
Features of a voiceless uvular fricative:

- Its manner of articulation is fricative, which means it is produced by constricting air flow through a narrow channel at the place of articulation, causing turbulence.
- Its place of articulation is uvular, which means it is articulated with the back of the tongue (the dorsum) at the uvula.
- Its phonation is voiceless, which means it is produced without vibrations of the vocal cords. In some languages the vocal cords are actively separated, so it is always voiceless; in others the cords are lax, so that it may take on the voicing of adjacent sounds.
- It is an oral consonant, which means that air is not allowed to escape through the nose.
- It is a median consonant, which means it is produced by directing the airstream down the midline of the tongue, rather than to the sides.
- Its airstream mechanism is pulmonic, which means it is articulated by pushing air only with the intercostal muscles and abdominal muscles, as in most speech sounds.

== Occurrence ==
Language		Word	IPA	Meaning	Notes
Afrikaans		goed	[χut]	'good'	Varies between a fricative and a fricative trill when word-initial. See Afrikaans phonology.
Armenian		խաղ / xaġ	[χɑʁ]	'game'	
Azerbaijani		sancaq	[sɑndʒɑχ]	'pin'	Colloquial pronunciation of word-final q.
Blackfoot	Some speakers	ᖳᐠᐦᖽ / Aohkíí	[ɔχkíː]	'water'	Most speakers always pronounced 'h' as /x/ in central and back vowels.
Breton	Some speakers	c'hwec'h	[χwɛχ]	'six'	
Chuvash		хăна / hăna	[χəˈna]	'guest'	
Danish	Standard	pres	[ˈpχæs]	'pressure'	Before /r/, aspiration of /p, t, k/ is realized as devoicing of /r/. Usually transcribed in IPA with ⟨ʁ⟩. See Danish phonology.
Dutch		acht	[ɑχt]	'eight'	Allophone of ⟨x⟩. See Dutch phonology.
English	Scouse	clock	[kl̥ɒχ]	'clock'	Possible word-final realization of /k/; varies between a fricative and a fricative trill.
English	Scouse	neck	[nɛχ]	'neck'	Possible word-final realization of /k/; varies between a fricative and a fricative trill.
English	Welsh	Amlwch	[ˈamlʊχ]	'Amlwch'	Occurs only in loanwords from Welsh; usually transcribed in IPA with ⟨x⟩. See English phonology
English	White South African	gogga	[ˈχɒχə]	'insect'	Less commonly velar [x], occurs only in loanwords from Afrikaans and Khoisan. Usually transcribed in IPA with ⟨x⟩. See White South African English phonology and English phonology.
French		très	[t̪χɛ]	'very'	Allophone of /ʁ/ in contact with voiceless consonants. See French phonology
German	Standard	Dach	[daχ]	'roof'	Appears only after certain back vowels. See Standard German phonology
German	Chemnitz dialect	Rock	[χɔkʰ]	'skirt'	In free variation with [ʁ̞], [ʁ], [ʀ̥] and [q]. Does not occur in coda.
German	Lower Rhine	Wirte	[ˈvɪχtə]	'hosts'	In free variation with [ɐ] between a vowel and a voiceless coronal consonant.
Hebrew		מֶלֶךְ / mélekh	[ˈme̞le̞χ]	'king'	Usually a fricative trill. See Modern Hebrew phonology.
Luxembourgish		Zuch	[t͡suχ]	'train'	See Luxembourgish phonology.
Nuxalk		sxs	[sχs]	'fat, grease'	Contrasts with /χʷ/.
Persian	Standard	خاک xâk	[χɒːk]	'soil'	In some eastern dialects (e.g., Dari), it is realized as a velar [x]. See Persian phonology.
Portuguese	General Brazilian	rompimento	[χõpiˈmẽtʊ]	'rupture' (noun)	Some dialects, corresponds to rhotic consonant /ʁ/. See Portuguese phonology.
Ripuarian		ach	[ɑχ]	'eight'	Allophone of /x/ after back vowels. Fronted to [ç] or [ʃ] after front vowels and consonants. It may be transcribed in IPA with ⟨x⟩. See Colognian phonology, Kerkrade dialect phonology and Hard and soft G in Dutch
Spanish	Northern and Central Peninsular	juego	[ˈχwe̞ɣ̞o̞]	'game'	Post-velar or uvular in all contexts, or velar with a uvular allophone ([χ]) appearing before /o/ and /u/ (including when /u/ is in the syllable onset as [w]). See Spanish phonology.
Spanish	Ponce dialect (in Puerto Rico)	perro	[ˈpe̞χo̞]	'dog'	This and [ʀ̥] are the primary realizations of /r/ in this dialect. See Spanish phonology.
Tlingit		-dáx̱	[dáχ]	'from, out of'	Occurs plain, labialised, ejective, and labialised ejective.
Turkmen		gahar	[ɢɑχɑɾ]	'snow'	
Welsh		chwech	[χweːχ]	'six'	See Welsh phonology.
Yiddish		איך / ikh	[iχ]	'I'	See Yiddish phonology.

== See also ==
- Index of phonetics articles
- Voiced uvular fricative

== Notes ==
Place →	Labial					Coronal										Dorsal					Laryngeal			
Manner ↓	Bilabial		Labiodental		Linguolabial		Dental		Alveolar		Postalveolar		Retroflex		(Alveolo-)palatal		Velar		Uvular		Pharyngeal/epiglottal		Glottal	
Nasal	m̥	m	ɱ̊	ɱ		n̼	n̪̊	n̪	n̥	n	n̠̊	n̠	ɳ̊	ɳ	ɲ̊	ɲ	ŋ̊	ŋ	ɴ̥	ɴ				
Plosive	p	b	p̪	b̪	t̼	d̼	t̪	d̪	t	d			ʈ	ɖ	c	ɟ	k	ɡ	q	ɢ	ʡ		ʔ	
Sibilant affricate							t̪s̪	d̪z̪	ts	dz	t̠ʃ	d̠ʒ	tʂ	dʐ	tɕ	dʑ								
Non-sibilant affricate	pɸ	bβ	p̪f	b̪v			t̪θ	d̪ð	tɹ̝̊	dɹ̝	t̠ɹ̠̊˔	d̠ɹ̠˔			cç	ɟʝ	kx	ɡɣ	qχ	ɢʁ	ʡʜ	ʡʢ	ʔh	
Sibilant fricative							s̪	z̪	s	z	ʃ	ʒ	ʂ	ʐ	ɕ	ʑ								
Non-sibilant fricative	ɸ	β	f	v	θ̼	ð̼	θ	ð	θ̠	ð̠	ɹ̠̊˔	ɹ̠˔	ɻ̊˔	ɻ˔	ç	ʝ	x	ɣ	χ	ʁ	ħ	ʕ	h	ɦ
Approximant		β̞		ʋ				ð̞		ɹ		ɹ̠		ɻ		j		ɰ						˷
Tap/flap		ⱱ̟		ⱱ					ɾ̥	ɾ			ɽ̊	ɽ						ɢ̆		ʡ̆		
Trill	ʙ̥	ʙ							r̥	r		r̠	ɽ̊r̥	ɽr					ʀ̥	ʀ	ʜ	ʢ		
Lateral affricate									tɬ	dɮ			tꞎ	d𝼅	c𝼆	ɟʎ̝	k𝼄	ɡʟ̝						
Lateral fricative							ɬ̪		ɬ	ɮ			ꞎ	𝼅	𝼆	ʎ̝	𝼄	ʟ̝						
Lateral approximant								l̪	l̥	l		l̠	ɭ̊	ɭ	ʎ̥	ʎ	ʟ̥	ʟ		ʟ̠				
Lateral tap/flap									ɺ̥	ɺ			𝼈̊	𝼈		ʎ̆		ʟ̆						

		BL	LD	D	A	PA	RF	P	V	U
Implosive	Voiced	ɓ			ɗ		ᶑ	ʄ	ɠ	ʛ
Implosive	Voiceless	ɓ̥			ɗ̥		ᶑ̊	ʄ̊	ɠ̊	ʛ̥
Ejective	Stop	pʼ			tʼ		ʈʼ	cʼ	kʼ	qʼ
Ejective	Affricate		p̪fʼ	tθʼ	tsʼ	tʃʼ	tʂʼ	tɕʼ	kxʼ	qχʼ
Ejective	Fricative	ɸʼ	fʼ	θʼ	sʼ	ʃʼ	ʂʼ	ɕʼ	xʼ	χʼ
Ejective	Lateral affricate				tɬʼ			c𝼆ʼ	k𝼄ʼ	q𝼄ʼ
Ejective	Lateral fricative				ɬʼ					
Click (top: velar; bottom: uvular)	Tenuis	kʘ qʘ		kǀ qǀ	kǃ qǃ		k𝼊 q𝼊	kǂ qǂ		
Click (top: velar; bottom: uvular)	Voiced	ɡʘ ɢʘ		ɡǀ ɢǀ	ɡǃ ɢǃ		ɡ𝼊 ɢ𝼊	ɡǂ ɢǂ		
Click (top: velar; bottom: uvular)	Nasal	ŋʘ ɴʘ		ŋǀ ɴǀ	ŋǃ ɴǃ		ŋ𝼊 ɴ𝼊	ŋǂ ɴǂ	ʞ	
Click (top: velar; bottom: uvular)	Tenuis lateral				kǁ qǁ					
Click (top: velar; bottom: uvular)	Voiced lateral				ɡǁ ɢǁ					
Click (top: velar; bottom: uvular)	Nasal lateral				ŋǁ ɴǁ					
