= Voiced bilabial fricative =

Consonantal sound represented by ⟨β⟩ in IPA

β

ꞵ
- IPA number: 127

Audio sample
- source · help

Encoding
- Entity (decimal): &#946;
- Unicode (hex): U+03B2
- X-SAMPA: B
- Braille: ⠨ (braille pattern dots-46) ⠃ (braille pattern dots-12)
Image

A voiced bilabial fricative is a type of consonantal sound, used in some spoken languages. The symbol in the International Phonetic Alphabet that represents this sound is either a Latin or Greek-style beta, ⟨β⟩.

This letter is also often used to represent a § voiced bilabial approximant, though that is more precisely written with a lowering diacritic, that is ⟨β̞⟩. This sound may also be transcribed as an advanced labiodental approximant ⟨ʋ̟⟩, in which case the diacritic is again frequently omitted, since no contrast between the two is likely within a language. It has been proposed that either a turned ⟨β⟩ or reversed ⟨β⟩, among others, be used as a dedicated symbol for the bilabial approximant; however, despite occasional usage, none have gained general acceptance.

It is extremely rare for a language to make a phonemic contrast between a voiced bilabial fricative and a bilabial approximant. The Mapos Buang language of New Guinea contains this contrast. Its bilabial approximant is analyzed as filling a phonological gap in the labiovelar series of the consonant system rather than the bilabial series. Proto-Germanic and Proto-Italic are reconstructed as having had a contrast between the voiced bilabial fricative and the voiced labial–velar approximant /w/, albeit with [β] being an allophone for another consonant in both cases. In Bashkir language, it is an intervocal allophone of /b/, and it is contrastive with /w/: балабыҙ [bɑɫɑˈβɯð] ('our child'), балауыҙ [bɑɫɑˈwɯð] ('wax').

A bilabial fricative is diachronically unstable (likely to be considerably varied between dialects of a language that makes use of it) and is likely to shift to [v].

The sound is not the primary realization of any sound in English dialects except for Chicano English, but it can be produced by approximating the normal English [v] between the lips; it can also sometimes occur as an allophone of /v/ after bilabial consonants.

== Features ==
Features of a voiced bilabial fricative:

- Its manner of articulation is fricative, which means it is produced by constricting air flow through a narrow channel at the place of articulation, causing turbulence.
- Its place of articulation is bilabial, which means it is articulated with both lips.
- Its phonation is voiced, which means the vocal cords vibrate during the articulation.
- It is an oral consonant, which means that air is not allowed to escape through the nose.
- Because the sound is not produced with airflow over the tongue, the median–lateral dichotomy does not apply.
- Its airstream mechanism is pulmonic, which means it is articulated by pushing air only with the intercostal muscles and abdominal muscles, as in most speech sounds.

== Occurrence ==
Language		Word	IPA	Meaning	Notes
Akei		[βati]		'four'	
Alekano		hanuva	[hɑnɯβɑ]	'nothing'	
Angor		fufung	[ɸuβuŋ]	'horn'	
Bengali	Eastern dialects	ভিসা / bhisā	[βisa]	'Visa'	Allophone of /v/ in Bangladesh and Tripura; /bʱ/ used in Western dialects.
Berta		[βɑ̀lɑ̀ːziʔ]		'no'	
Chinese	Fuzhou	初八 / chĕ̤ báik	[t͡sœ˥˧βaiʔ˨˦]	'eighth day of the month'	Allophone of /p/ and /pʰ/ in certain intervocalic positions.
Chinese	Suburban Shanghainese	碗盞 / ve tse	[βe̝˧˧˦tsɛ̝˥]	'bowl'	Usually [ɦu] or [u] in other Wu dialects
Comorian		upvendza	[uβendza]	'to love'	Contrasts with both [v] and [w]
Coptic	Bohairic	ⲧⲱⲃⲓ	[ˈdoːβi]	'brick'	Shifted to [w] with a syllable coda allophone of [b] in a later stage.
Coptic	Sahidic	ⲧⲱⲱⲃⲉ	[ˈtoːβə]	'brick'	
Dahalo		[koːβo]		'to want'	Weak fricative or approximant. It is a common intervocalic allophone of /b/, and may be simply a plosive [b] instead.
English	Chicano	very	[βɛɹi]	'very'	Pronunciation of ⟨v⟩; may be realized as [b] instead, as it is in Spanish
Epena Pedee		náwe	[ˈnãβ̃ẽ]	'mother'	Word medial realization of /w/; nasal syllable allophone in free variation with a nasalized approximant [w̃].
Ewe		Eʋe	[èβe]	'Ewe'	Contrasts with both [v] and [w]
Fijian		ivava	[iβaːβaː]	'shoe'	
German		aber	[ˈaːβɐ]	'but'	Intervocalic and pre-lateral allophone of /b/ in casual speech. See Standard German phonology
Hopi		tsivot	[tsiːβot]	'five'	
Japanese		神戸 / kōbe	[ko̞ːβe̞]	'Kobe'	Allophone of /b/ only in fast speech between vowels. See Japanese phonology
Kabyle		bri	[βri]	'to cut'	
Kinyarwanda		abana	[aβaːna]	'children'	
Korean		추후 / chuhu / 追後	[ˈt͡ɕʰuβʷu]	'later'	Intervocalic allophone of /h/ before /o/, /u/, and /w/. See Korean phonology
Luhya	Wanga Dialect	Nabongo	[naβonɡo]	'title for a king'	
Mapos Buang		venġévsën	[βəˈɴɛβt͡ʃen]	'prayer'	Mapos Buang has both a voiced bilabial fricative and a bilabial approximant as separate phonemes. The fricative is transcribed as ⟨v⟩, and the approximant as ⟨w⟩.
Marwari		ब़ीरौ / bīrau	[βiːɾɔː]	'brother'	
Nepali		सभा / sabhā	[sʌβä]	'meeting'	Allophone of /bʱ/. See Nepali phonology
Portuguese	European	sábado	[ˈsaβɐðu]	'Saturday'	Allophone of /b/. See Portuguese phonology
Ripuarian	Colognian	wing	[βɪŋ]	'wine'	Allophone of syllable-initial /v/ for some speakers; can be [ʋ ~ w ~ ɰ] instead. See Colognian phonology
Sardinian	Logudorese	paba	[ˈpäːβä]	'pope'	Intervocalic allophone of /b/ as well as word-initial /p/ when the preceding word ends with a vowel and there is no pause between the words.
Turkish		vücut	[βy̠ˈd͡ʒu̞t̪]	'body'	Allophone of /v/ before and after rounded vowels. See Turkish phonology
Turkmen		watan	[βatan]	'country'	
Venda		davha	/daβa/	'work party held by one who wants to have the land ploughed or cultivated'	Contrasts with /v/ and /w/
Zapotec	Tilquiapan				Allophone of /b/

=== Voiced bilabial approximant ===
Voiced bilabial approximant

β̞

ꞵ̞

Audio sample
- source · help
Image

A voiced bilabial approximant is a similar sound with less turbulent airflow. The IPA has no dedicated symbol that represents this sound, but it may be transcribed as ⟨β̞⟩ (a lowered [β]). The following list includes languages with variable pronunciations.

Language		Word	IPA	Meaning	Notes
Amharic		አበባ	[aβ̞əβ̞a]	'flower'	Allophone of /b/ medially between sonorants.
Asturian		abanicu	[aβ̞aˈnikʊ]	'swing'	Allophone of /b/
Basque		alaba	[alaβ̞a]	'daughter'	Allophone of /b/
Catalan	Many dialects	abans	[əˈβ̞äns]	'before'	Approximant or fricative. Allophone of /b/. Mainly found in betacist (/b/ and /v/ merging) dialects (Northern, North-Western, Central Catalan and Central Valencian). See Catalan phonology
Catalan	Many dialects	avanç	[əˈβ̞äns]	'advance'	Approximant or fricative. Allophone of /b/. Mainly found in betacist (/b/ and /v/ merging) dialects (Northern, North-Western, Central Catalan and Central Valencian). See Catalan phonology
Cia-Cia		ᄫᅡᆯ루 / walu	[β̞alu]	'eight'	Allophone of /β/
Dutch	Southern	wang	[β̞aŋ]	'cheek'	Labiovelar [ʋ] in northern Dutch.
Extremaduran		cabra	[ˈkäβ̞ɾɐ]	'goat'	Approximant or fricative. Allophone of /b/
Galician		abaixo	[äˈβ̞ajʃʊ]	'down'	Approximant or fricative. Allophone of /b/. See Galician phonology
Indonesian		tawa	[taβ̞a]	'laugh'	Allophone of /w/ by some younger speakers.
Japanese		私 / watashi	[β̞ätäɕi]	'me'	Usually represented phonemically as /w/. See Japanese phonology
Katë	Western	dav	[d̪aβ̞]	'wood'	Corresponds to [ʋʷ] and [v] in other dialects.
Kyrgyz		ооба	[оːˈβ̞a]	'yes'	Allophone of /b/ medially between vowels.
Limburgish	Maastrichtian	wèlle	[ˈβ̞ɛ̝lə]	'to want'	
Lombard		el nava via	[el ˈnaβ̞a ˈβ̞ia]	'he was going away'	Regular pronunciation of /v/ when intervocalic. Used also as an allophone for other positions.
Mapos Buang		wabeenġ	[β̞aˈᵐbɛːɴ]	'kind of yam'	Mapos Buang has both a voiced bilabial fricative and a bilabial approximant as separate phonemes. The fricative is transcribed as ⟨v⟩, and the approximant as ⟨w⟩.
Occitan	Gascon	lavetz	[laˈβ̞ets]	'then'	Allophone of /b/
Ripuarian	Kerkrade	sjwaam	[ʃβ̞aːm]	'smoke'	Weakly rounded; contrasts with /v/. See Kerkrade dialect phonology
Spanish		lava	[ˈläβ̞ä]	'lava'	Ranges from close fricative to approximant. Allophone of /b/. See Spanish phonology
Swedish	Central Standard	Saudiarabien	[ˈsɐ̠̂ɯ̯ᵝd̥iˑɐɾˌɒːβ̞ʝɜn]	'Saudi Arabia'	Allophone of /b/ in casual speech. See Swedish phonology
Ukrainian		вона	[β̞oˈnɑ]	'she'	An approximant; the most common prevocalic realization of /w/. Can vary with labiodental [ʋ]. See Ukrainian phonology

== See also ==
- Index of phonetics articles

== Notes ==
Place →	Labial					Coronal										Dorsal					Laryngeal			
Manner ↓	Bilabial		Labiodental		Linguolabial		Dental		Alveolar		Postalveolar		Retroflex		(Alveolo-)palatal		Velar		Uvular		Pharyngeal/epiglottal		Glottal	
Nasal	m̥	m	ɱ̊	ɱ		n̼	n̪̊	n̪	n̥	n	n̠̊	n̠	ɳ̊	ɳ	ɲ̊	ɲ	ŋ̊	ŋ	ɴ̥	ɴ				
Plosive	p	b	p̪	b̪	t̼	d̼	t̪	d̪	t	d			ʈ	ɖ	c	ɟ	k	ɡ	q	ɢ	ʡ		ʔ	
Sibilant affricate							t̪s̪	d̪z̪	ts	dz	t̠ʃ	d̠ʒ	tʂ	dʐ	tɕ	dʑ								
Non-sibilant affricate	pɸ	bβ	p̪f	b̪v			t̪θ	d̪ð	tɹ̝̊	dɹ̝	t̠ɹ̠̊˔	d̠ɹ̠˔			cç	ɟʝ	kx	ɡɣ	qχ	ɢʁ	ʡʜ	ʡʢ	ʔh	
Sibilant fricative							s̪	z̪	s	z	ʃ	ʒ	ʂ	ʐ	ɕ	ʑ								
Non-sibilant fricative	ɸ	β	f	v	θ̼	ð̼	θ	ð	θ̠	ð̠	ɹ̠̊˔	ɹ̠˔	ɻ̊˔	ɻ˔	ç	ʝ	x	ɣ	χ	ʁ	ħ	ʕ	h	ɦ
Approximant		β̞		ʋ				ð̞		ɹ		ɹ̠		ɻ		j		ɰ						˷
Tap/flap		ⱱ̟		ⱱ					ɾ̥	ɾ			ɽ̊	ɽ						ɢ̆		ʡ̆		
Trill	ʙ̥	ʙ							r̥	r		r̠	ɽ̊r̥	ɽr					ʀ̥	ʀ	ʜ	ʢ		
Lateral affricate									tɬ	dɮ			tꞎ	d𝼅	c𝼆	ɟʎ̝	k𝼄	ɡʟ̝						
Lateral fricative							ɬ̪		ɬ	ɮ			ꞎ	𝼅	𝼆	ʎ̝	𝼄	ʟ̝						
Lateral approximant								l̪	l̥	l		l̠	ɭ̊	ɭ	ʎ̥	ʎ	ʟ̥	ʟ		ʟ̠				
Lateral tap/flap									ɺ̥	ɺ			𝼈̊	𝼈		ʎ̆		ʟ̆						

		BL	LD	D	A	PA	RF	P	V	U
Implosive	Voiced	ɓ			ɗ		ᶑ	ʄ	ɠ	ʛ
Implosive	Voiceless	ɓ̥			ɗ̥		ᶑ̊	ʄ̊	ɠ̊	ʛ̥
Ejective	Stop	pʼ			tʼ		ʈʼ	cʼ	kʼ	qʼ
Ejective	Affricate		p̪fʼ	tθʼ	tsʼ	tʃʼ	tʂʼ	tɕʼ	kxʼ	qχʼ
Ejective	Fricative	ɸʼ	fʼ	θʼ	sʼ	ʃʼ	ʂʼ	ɕʼ	xʼ	χʼ
Ejective	Lateral affricate				tɬʼ			c𝼆ʼ	k𝼄ʼ	q𝼄ʼ
Ejective	Lateral fricative				ɬʼ					
Click (top: velar; bottom: uvular)	Tenuis	kʘ qʘ		kǀ qǀ	kǃ qǃ		k𝼊 q𝼊	kǂ qǂ		
Click (top: velar; bottom: uvular)	Voiced	ɡʘ ɢʘ		ɡǀ ɢǀ	ɡǃ ɢǃ		ɡ𝼊 ɢ𝼊	ɡǂ ɢǂ		
Click (top: velar; bottom: uvular)	Nasal	ŋʘ ɴʘ		ŋǀ ɴǀ	ŋǃ ɴǃ		ŋ𝼊 ɴ𝼊	ŋǂ ɴǂ	ʞ	
Click (top: velar; bottom: uvular)	Tenuis lateral				kǁ qǁ					
Click (top: velar; bottom: uvular)	Voiced lateral				ɡǁ ɢǁ					
Click (top: velar; bottom: uvular)	Nasal lateral				ŋǁ ɴǁ					
