= Akademie för uns Kölsche Sproch =

Language academy

The Akademie för uns Kölsche Sproch (Academy for our Colognian language) was established in 1983 by the Stadtsparkasse Köln (Cologne Savings and Loan Association). As part of the bank's foundation for culture, this academy campaigns for the preservation and promotion of the Kölsch dialect as a language.

== Activities ==
The academy has five main areas of activity: studying the Cologne dialect, holding seminars, running a library and dialect archive, holding events and producing publications.

While the academy does not teach the Cologne dialect as a foreign language, the seminars cover the themes of language use, linguistics and literature, as well as looking into the history of the city and the dialect. Written and oral Kölsch examinations are held, with successful candidates receiving a certificate signed by the city mayor.

The academy has attempted to create an authoritative orthography for the Cologne dialect, which is relatively conservative compared to the usual ad hoc spellings, and for example does not change the spelling of historic /g/ to fit its current day pronunciations; the greeting Joode(n) Daach! "good day" [joː¹.də(n) ˈdaː²x] is written Gode(n) Dag! according to the academy. All materials written or published by the academy are edited into this standardized scheme.

== Library ==
The library is divided into five sections, the main section being "Cologne" with 7,000 books. It also has the sections "Rhineland", and "local languages spoken in area of the German Dachsprache", and "general Germanic linguistics", and there is standard literature such as encyclopedies, bibliographies, and other directories available. They have and all kinds of media in addition to printed books, including a notable collection of historic picture postcards of Cologne.

== Publisher ==
The academy acts as a publisher, with 25 books in and on the Kölsch dialect and on the history of the city currently in print. It has also produced an interactive CD-ROM dialect dictionary, a set of voice recordings to be used in automotive navigation systems or personal navigation assistants, and an interactive internet banking portal for the Cologne Savings and Loan Association in Colognian language. Larger books are usually produced and published by or in cooperation with one of the major publishing companies in Cologne, such as Bachem, Bouvier, or Greven. There are cooperations with the Landschaftsverband Rheinland as well.
