= Sj-sound =

Voiceless fricative phoneme of Swedish

ɧ
- IPA number: 175

Audio sample
- source · help

Encoding
- Entity (decimal): &#615;
- Unicode (hex): U+0267
- X-SAMPA: x\
Image

The sj-sound (Swedish: sj-ljudet [ˈɧêːˌjʉːdɛt], also sje-ljudet or 7-ljudet) is a voiceless fricative phoneme found in the sound system of most dialects of Swedish. It has a variety of realisations, whose precise phonetic characterisations are a matter of debate, but which often feature distinct labialization. The sound is represented in Swedish orthography by a number of spellings, the most common of which are ⟨sj⟩ (from which the common Swedish name for the sound is derived), ⟨stj⟩, ⟨skj⟩, and (before front vowels) ⟨sk⟩; if considered in complementary distribution with [ʂ], up to 65 different spellings for the phoneme have been identified in native words and loanwords. The sound should not be confused with the Swedish tj-sound /ɕ/, usually spelled ⟨tj⟩, ⟨kj⟩, or (before front vowels) ⟨k⟩.

The IPA letter for these sounds, ⟨ɧ⟩ (called Hooktop heng in the IPA Handbook), has occasionally been used for other languages, but this is only useful as an abstraction (as indeed it is in Swedish).

== Features ==
The sj-sounds are transcribed ⟨ɧ⟩ in the International Phonetic Alphabet. The International Phonetic Association (IPA) describes [ɧ] as "simultaneous [ʃ] and [x]" (that is, [ʃ͜x]). Other descriptive labels include:

- Voiceless postalveolo-velar fricative, voiceless postalveolar and velar fricative, and voiceless coarticulated velar and palatoalveolar fricative, all of which correspond to [ʃ͜x];
- Voiceless palatal-velar fricative and voiceless dorso-palatal velar fricative, which correspond to [ç͡x].

However, neither of these realizations are attested, and phoneticians doubt that such a realization is possible in "ordinary language," as it is difficult to produce, or even to hear, turbulent (fricative) airflow at two places of articulation simultaneously.

The closest sound found in English, as well as many other languages, is the voiceless postalveolar fricative [ʃ] (Swedish words with the sound often correspond to English words with "sh", such as "shield", "shoot", from earlier Proto-Germanic *sk), although usually the closest audible approximation is the voiceless labialized velar approximant [w̥] found in some English dialects. Regionally, it varies from being more [w̥]-like in the standard speech, to being more [ʃ]-like in northern Sweden and Finland. The tj-sound (which often corresponds to English words with "ch", such as "chicken", "church") remains distinct, varying from more [ʃ]-like (i.e., /ɕ/) in the standard speech to more [tʃ]-like in northern Sweden and Finland.

== Phonetic realization in Swedish ==
The word skjuta "to shoot", as pronounced in Central Standard Swedish, Småland Swedish, Norrland Swedish, Finland Swedish and Rinkeby Swedish, respectively.

The place of articulation of the sj-sound varies over Swedish regions and is not agreed upon. It has been variously found to be the following:

- velar and postalveolar, meaning it is articulated simultaneously with the tongue dorsum (i.e. the back part of the tongue) approximating the velum (i.e. the soft palate, like [x]) and just behind the teeth (like [ʃ]). However, doubly articulated fricatives are very difficult to pronounce or to hear, and many linguists doubt that they exist.
- Lindblad describes one of two common variants of Swedish /ɧ/ as labiodental with simultaneous velarization and protrusion of the upper lip, which would be transcribed as [fˠʷ]. (The English sigh of relief phew! is one approximation, as is the voiceless labial-velar approximant that is used in some varieties of English.) He does not use the symbol ⟨ɧ⟩ for this allophone.
- Lindblad describes the second common variant of Swedish /ɧ/ as velar. The difference between it and the cardinal velar [x] is not clear, but it may have less friction ([x̞]), or be further forward ([x̟]), or both ([x̞᫈]).
- Riad notes that the basic dorsal place of assimilation can be determined by the place of assimilation of a preceding nasal, with en skjorta 'a shirt', for example, being pronounced [ɛŋˈɧʊʈːa]. He notes a labialized allophone [ɧᶠ].
- A number of intermediate possibilities between these extremes.
- Other articulations have been described as well, with no obvious standard emerging.

Consider the following comments by Peter Ladefoged and Ian Maddieson:

Some dialects of Swedish have a fricative that has been said to have two or even three articulatory constrictions (Abercrombie 1967). We do not, however, think it is correct for more than one of these constrictions to be considered a fricative articulation. There is good data available on the Swedish sibilant fricatives (Lindblad 1980) allowing us to consider these sounds in detail. [...] The basic descriptive problem is one of geographical, social, and stylistic variation. [...]

The [...] Swedish fricative, usually symbolized by ɧ, is the most interesting. Lindblad describes two common variants of Swedish ɧ. The first, for which he uses a different symbol, he calls a highly rounded, labiodental, velar or velarized fricative. [...] Lindblad suggests that the source of frication is between the lower lip and the upper teeth, and it certainly appears to be so from his x-ray. He also demonstrates that the upper lip is considerably protruded in comparison with its position with that in the gesture of i. In addition to these anterior gestures, Lindblad notes that the "tongue body is raised and retracted towards the velum to form a fairly narrow constriction. (The presence of this constriction is constant, but not its width or location, which vary considerably.)" The posterior constriction in this variety of ɧ is not great enough to be itself a source of turbulence, so that, although this sound may have three notable constrictions, one in the velar region, one labiodental, and a lesser one between the two lips, only the labiodental constriction is a source of friction.

The second common variant of Swedish ɧ [...] is described by Lindblad as a "dorsovelar voiceless fricative" pronounced with the jaw more open and without the lip protrusion that occurs in the other variety. Lindblad suggests that the difference between this sound and the more usual velar fricative x is that the latter "is formed with low frequency irregular vibrations in the saliva at the constriction" (Lindblad 1980, our translation). We infer from his descriptions and diagrams that this variant of ɧ has less frication, and may be slightly further forward than the velar fricative x commonly found in other languages. Lindblad claims that between the extreme positions of the labiodental ɧ and the more velar ɧ, "there are a number of intermediate types with various jaw and lip positions, including some with both anterior and posterior sound sources." [W]e doubt that it is possible to produce turbulence at two points in mouth simultaneously for ordinary linguistic purposes.

[...]

The most well-known case [of a possible multiply articulated fricative] is the Swedish segment that has been described as a doubly articulated voiceless palato-alveolo-velar fricative, i.e., ʃ͡x. The IPA even goes so far as to provide a separate symbol for this sound on its chart, namely ɧ. The sound in question is one variant of the pronunciation of the phonological element ʃ, which is highly variable in Swedish dialects, receiving pronunciations ranging from a palatalized bilabial sound to a velarized palato-alveolar one to a fully velar one. [I]t is not clear that any of the variants is actually a doubly articulated fricative.

— Ladefoged & Maddieson 1996, pp. 171–172, 329–330

== Use of the letter ɧ for other languages ==
=== Colognian ===
A sound transcribed with ⟨ɧ⟩ is also reported to occur in the Colognian dialect of Ripuarian in Germany, being articulated in positions in words that enveloping Standard German has [ç].

The acoustic difference between /ʃ/ and the Kölsch /ɧ/ is difficult to perceive but the articulation is clearly distinct. A similarity between Swedish /ɧ/ and the Kölsch /ɧ/ has not been established, and comments suggest that the choice of ⟨ɧ⟩ might well have been based upon a misunderstanding. Certainly, the Kölsch /ɧ/ is not doubly articulated and even contrasts with a slightly velarized /ʃ/.

Some phoneticians, such as Georg Sachse of the University of Cologne in his lessons on IPA transcription, suggest that ⟨ɕ⟩ might be a better symbol for the sound.

=== Himalayan languages ===
A sound transcribed with ⟨ɧ⟩ is also reported word-initially and word-medially in the Wutun language, where it is described simply as a "velar glide", which would be [ɰ]. The symbol has also been used for an allophone of /s~ʃ/ that occurs before /t/ in some accents of the Bahing language of Nepal.

== See also ==
- Index of phonetics articles
- Rheinische Dokumenta
- Swedish phonology

== Sources ==
- Abercrombie, David (1967), Elements of general phonetics, Chicago: Aldine
- Garlén, Claes (1988), Svenskans fonologi : [i kontrastiv och typologisk belysning] (in Swedish), Lund: Studentlitteratur [Ny utg.]
- Ladefoged, Peter; Maddieson, Ian (1996). The Sounds of the World's Languages. Oxford: Blackwell. ISBN 0-631-19815-6.
- Lindblad, Per (1980), "Svenskans sj- och tj-ljud i ett Allmänfonetisk Perspektiv", Travaux de l'Institut de Linguistique de Lund (in Swedish) (16), Lund: C. W. K. Gleerup

Place →	Labial					Coronal										Dorsal					Laryngeal			
Manner ↓	Bilabial		Labiodental		Linguolabial		Dental		Alveolar		Postalveolar		Retroflex		(Alveolo-)palatal		Velar		Uvular		Pharyngeal/epiglottal		Glottal	
Nasal	m̥	m	ɱ̊	ɱ		n̼	n̪̊	n̪	n̥	n	n̠̊	n̠	ɳ̊	ɳ	ɲ̊	ɲ	ŋ̊	ŋ	ɴ̥	ɴ				
Plosive	p	b	p̪	b̪	t̼	d̼	t̪	d̪	t	d			ʈ	ɖ	c	ɟ	k	ɡ	q	ɢ	ʡ		ʔ	
Sibilant affricate							t̪s̪	d̪z̪	ts	dz	t̠ʃ	d̠ʒ	tʂ	dʐ	tɕ	dʑ								
Non-sibilant affricate	pɸ	bβ	p̪f	b̪v			t̪θ	d̪ð	tɹ̝̊	dɹ̝	t̠ɹ̠̊˔	d̠ɹ̠˔			cç	ɟʝ	kx	ɡɣ	qχ	ɢʁ	ʡʜ	ʡʢ	ʔh	
Sibilant fricative							s̪	z̪	s	z	ʃ	ʒ	ʂ	ʐ	ɕ	ʑ								
Non-sibilant fricative	ɸ	β	f	v	θ̼	ð̼	θ	ð	θ̠	ð̠	ɹ̠̊˔	ɹ̠˔	ɻ̊˔	ɻ˔	ç	ʝ	x	ɣ	χ	ʁ	ħ	ʕ	h	ɦ
Approximant		β̞		ʋ				ð̞		ɹ		ɹ̠		ɻ		j		ɰ						˷
Tap/flap		ⱱ̟		ⱱ					ɾ̥	ɾ			ɽ̊	ɽ						ɢ̆		ʡ̆		
Trill	ʙ̥	ʙ							r̥	r		r̠	ɽ̊r̥	ɽr					ʀ̥	ʀ	ʜ	ʢ		
Lateral affricate									tɬ	dɮ			tꞎ	d𝼅	c𝼆	ɟʎ̝	k𝼄	ɡʟ̝						
Lateral fricative							ɬ̪		ɬ	ɮ			ꞎ	𝼅	𝼆	ʎ̝	𝼄	ʟ̝						
Lateral approximant								l̪	l̥	l		l̠	ɭ̊	ɭ	ʎ̥	ʎ	ʟ̥	ʟ		ʟ̠				
Lateral tap/flap									ɺ̥	ɺ			𝼈̊	𝼈		ʎ̆		ʟ̆						

		BL	LD	D	A	PA	RF	P	V	U
Implosive	Voiced	ɓ			ɗ		ᶑ	ʄ	ɠ	ʛ
Implosive	Voiceless	ɓ̥			ɗ̥		ᶑ̊	ʄ̊	ɠ̊	ʛ̥
Ejective	Stop	pʼ			tʼ		ʈʼ	cʼ	kʼ	qʼ
Ejective	Affricate		p̪fʼ	tθʼ	tsʼ	tʃʼ	tʂʼ	tɕʼ	kxʼ	qχʼ
Ejective	Fricative	ɸʼ	fʼ	θʼ	sʼ	ʃʼ	ʂʼ	ɕʼ	xʼ	χʼ
Ejective	Lateral affricate				tɬʼ			c𝼆ʼ	k𝼄ʼ	q𝼄ʼ
Ejective	Lateral fricative				ɬʼ					
Click (top: velar; bottom: uvular)	Tenuis	kʘ qʘ		kǀ qǀ	kǃ qǃ		k𝼊 q𝼊	kǂ qǂ		
Click (top: velar; bottom: uvular)	Voiced	ɡʘ ɢʘ		ɡǀ ɢǀ	ɡǃ ɢǃ		ɡ𝼊 ɢ𝼊	ɡǂ ɢǂ		
Click (top: velar; bottom: uvular)	Nasal	ŋʘ ɴʘ		ŋǀ ɴǀ	ŋǃ ɴǃ		ŋ𝼊 ɴ𝼊	ŋǂ ɴǂ	ʞ	
Click (top: velar; bottom: uvular)	Tenuis lateral				kǁ qǁ					
Click (top: velar; bottom: uvular)	Voiced lateral				ɡǁ ɢǁ					
Click (top: velar; bottom: uvular)	Nasal lateral				ŋǁ ɴǁ					
