= Historic Colognian =

Early form of the Colognian dialect

- Old Colognian
- Native to: Germany
- Region: Gotland
- Era: 12th-18th Century developed into Colognian
- Language family: Indo-European: Germanic; West Germanic; High German; Central German; West Central German; Central Franconian; Ripuarian; Central Ripuarian; Historic Colognian

Language codes
- ISO 639-3: None (mis)
- Glottolog: None

Historic Colognian or Old Colognian (German: Altkölnisch) was the spoken and written language of the city of Cologne in Germany from the 12th century to the 18th century, before the development of Modern Colognian. This classification is primarily based on the research and publications, including a dictionary by Dr. Adam Wrede (1875-1960), a linguist at the University of Cologne. He also published a dictionary of Modern Colognian, which is still reprinted today.

== History ==
Since the middle of the 5th century, Cologne was under the rule of the Franks, who took over after almost 500 years of Roman rule. The Franks brought their own language, which gradually replaced Latin as the common language of the residents. The Old Colognian language developed later than the 12th century, evolving from a mixture of the then old fashioned Ripuarian and Low Franconian dialects and Old High German. Old Franconian developed into a huge variety of dialects, including some of Old High German (and later Middle High German and New High German) and Old Low Franconian. So Old Colognian was already influenced by High German in the Middle Ages.

Old Colognian was not a mere dialect. It was the language of the Electorate of Cologne, spoken and written every day by both the ecclesiastical and secular authorities as well as the residents of the city and its surrounding area. So it was very well preserved through the Middle Ages and into the Modern times, with a rich variety arising from everyday use. Contemporary literature was written and later printed in Old Colognian. Beginning in the first half of the 16th century, even mundane literary sources exist.

During the 16th century, the influence of the New High German language increased in Cologne and along the Rhine River, changing the way of writing used by the monasteries, authorities, and printers. But it did not affect the spoken language of the ordinary citizens. This is evident from the written accounts of the 18th Century, when Colognian was revived for the literature, and they show the development of Old Colognian into Modern Colognian, at least in its spoken form.

Towards the end of the 16th century, the Low Franconian writing system was gradually abandoned by printers and offices in favor of the developing New High German writing system. Since then, spoken and written languages diverged in Cologne, and documents written in Old Colognian have grown scarce.
