= Colognian declension =

Declensions in the Colognian language

The Colognian declension system describes how the Colognian language alters words to reflect their roles in Colognian sentences, such as subject, direct object, indirect object, agent, patient, etc. Declension allows speakers to mark nouns as being used in their different roles – whether as subjects, direct objects, indirect objects, possessives, etc. – by changing the form of the noun plus any associated adjectives or articles instead of indicating this meaning through word order or prepositions (although this also happens in Colognian). Still, Colognian generally makes only limited use of word order; shifting words around either does not alter the meanings of sentences, or yields other types of sentences which have different meanings yet still maintain the roles of the referents of the words as long as their declined forms are kept.

Colognian is a predominantly fusional language. It marks its articles, adjectives, nouns, pronouns, and more to distinguish gender, case, and number.

Colognian today distinguishes between five cases: nominative, genitive, dative, accusative, and vocative. There are two kinds of genitives, both of which are periphrastic. One is normally positioned before the noun or noun phrase it refers to, the other always behind.

There are three grammatical genders in Colognian: feminine, masculine, and neuter. Almost all nouns have fixed genders, but there is a class of nouns that may switch gender from predominantly neuter to feminine on certain occasions. These almost always refer to female persons. Colognian shares this property with a large number of local and vernacular languages running almost the entire length of the Rhine river.

There are two grammatical numbers in Colognian: singular and plural. While a few individual words implicitly have either singular forms only or plural forms only and cannot be marked as the other, almost all nouns exhibit both forms.

Colognian has three grammatical persons: 1st person, 2nd person, and 3rd person. The plural form of the 1st person makes no semantic or formal distinction so as to differentiate between inclusion or exclusion of a 2nd person or a 3rd person, i.e. it always means: "me, but not me alone".

== Articles ==
Colognian grammatical articles come in several flavours:

1. stressed definite articles, or demonstrative articles: dä, däm, dat, der, die (the, this, that)
2. unstressed definite articles: de, dem, der, et (the)
3. indefinite articles: e, en, ene, enem, ener, ∅ (a, an, ∅)
4. possessive articles: er, eer, eere, eerem, eeren, eerer, di, ding, dinge, dingem, dingen, dinger, iehr, iehre, iehrem, iehren, iehrer, mi, ming, minge, mingem, mingen, minger, ons, onse, onsem, onsen, onser, si, sing, singe, singem, singen, singer, ühr, ühre, ührem, ühren, ührer, uns, unse, unsem, unsen, unser (her, his, its, my, our, their, your)

=== Usage and semantics ===
1. A demonstrative article, or stressed definite article, marks a select or specific one out of a set of possible ones, or a focused, special, specific, or only one. Anaphora always uses a stressed definite article, while exophora usually uses some pointing supplement such as heh (here) or doh (there), which may be prepended or appended to a noun phrase led by an article.
  - Example: dat Faaratt un kei ander (this pushbike, not another one)
2. An unstressed definite article is used to mark something unambiguous, known, having been mentioned already, not having a focus, or something general, but not arbitrary.
  - Example: et Faaratt es em Hoff (the pushbike is in the backyard)
3. An indefinite article marks something arbitrary, something unspecific, unspecified ones out of many, something general, or lacking individuality.
  - Example: e Faaratt ussem Laade (a pushbike from a shop)
4. A possessive article marks something as being part of, belonging to or relating to something else.
  - Example: Ühre Bus (your-PL bus)
    Colognian has possessive pronouns which can replace articles in phrases and expressions. In other words, a sentence can have either a possessive pronoun or an article in those positions but not both. Thus, these possessive pronouns can also be termed possessive articles when used in such cases. Since declension does not differ for possessive pronouns and possessive articles, declension is listed only once, under Possessive Pronouns.

=== Article declensions ===
Stressed definite articles	masculine singular	feminine singular	neuter singular	any gender plural
Nominative:	dä ~	die ~	dat ~	die ~
Genitive:	däm ~ sing(e) däm ~ si	dä ~ ier(e) dä ~ ehr	däm ~ sing(e) däm ~ si	dä ~ ier(e) dä ~ ehr
Genitive:	vun däm ~	vun dä ~	vun däm ~	vun dä ~
Dative:	däm ~	dä ~	däm ~	dä ~
Accusative:	dä ~	die ~	dat ~	die ~
Vocative:	∅ ~	∅ ~	∅ ~	∅ ~

Unstressed definite articles	masculine singular	feminine singular	neuter singular	any gender plural
Nominative:	der ~	de ~	et ~	de ~
Genitive:	dem ~ sing(e) dem ~ si	der ~ ier(e) der ~ ehr	dem ~ sing(e) dem ~ si	de ~ ier(e) de ~ ehr
Genitive:	vum ~ vun dem ~	vun der ~	vum ~ vun dem ~	vun de ~
Dative:	dem ~	der ~	dem ~	de ~
Accusative:	der ~	de ~	et ~	de ~
Vocative:	∅ ~	∅ ~	∅ ~	∅ ~

Indefinite articles	masculine singular	feminine singular	neuter singular	any gender plural
Nominative:	ene ~	en ~	e ~	∅ ~
Genitive:	enem ~ sing(e) enem ~ si	ener ~ ier(e) ener ~ er	enem ~ sing(e) enem ~ si	∅ ~ ier(e) ∅ ~ er
Genitive:	vun enem ~	vun ener ~	vun enem ~	vun ∅ ~
Dative:	enem ~	ener ~	enem ~	∅ ~
Accusative:	ene ~	en ~	e ~	∅ ~
Vocative:	∅ ~	∅ ~	∅ ~	∅ ~

Possessive articles	declension does not differ between possessive pronouns and possessive articles. See below under Possessive Pronouns.

== Numbers ==
(**) Singular is always used when there is exactly one instance of something. It may also occasionally be found with numbers having "one" at the end such as 1001, depending on how such figures are expressed. Plural is used for anything else but zero. With zero instances of something, either the singular or the plural might be chosen depending on the context and the particular noun. However, Colognian speakers most often choose wording that avoids expressions of the type "zero + noun", using expressions like nix (nothing), which is not declined, or kei (no, none), which is declined.

Zero (kein)	singular male	singular female	singular neuter	plural any gender
Nominative:	keine kei	kein kei	kein kei	kein kei
Genitive:	keinem sing(e)	keine iehr(e)	keinem sing(e)	keine iehr(e) kein iehr(e) kei iehr(e)
Genitive:	vun keinem	vun keiner	vun keinem	vun keine
Dative:	keinem	keiner	keinem	keinen
Accusative:	keine	kein	kein kei	kein kei
Vocative:	—	—	—	—

== Pronouns ==
In Colognian, pronouns come in several variations. There are demonstrative pronouns, stressed definite personal pronouns, unstressed definite personal pronouns, possessive pronouns, etc.

=== Pronoun use and semantics ===
Colognian demonstrative pronouns are used in sentences in positions where a noun phrase led by a stressed or demonstrative article could be used as well. The pronoun 'replaces' it for brevity. In fact, a demonstrative pronoun can formally be seen as a noun phrase with the article retained and anything else spared, because grammar forms of demonstrative pronouns and those of demonstrative articles exhibit no differences. Demonstrative pronouns are either strict anaphora, or can be cataphora being resolved within the same or next sentence or subsentence. The use as exophora is possible and reduces the choice of intonation and stress patterns to exactly one, most commonly supported by appropriate gestures.

- Example of cataphoric use: Es dat Ding Auto? (Is this your car?, Is that your car?)
- Example of anaphoric use: Dää küt noch! (Even though not yet here, he will come!)

There are personal pronouns for a variety of uses in Colognian. They all have in common that they link declension with an aspect of conjugation with their forms. While Colognian declension follows a case, gender, number scheme, the personal pronouns also decline for person. This scheme includes three grammatical persons: the 1st person which refers to the speaker or speakers as agents or patients of a sentence; the 2nd person which addresses the listener or listeners of the speaker or speakers as agents or patients of a sentence; and the 3rd person which refers to something or someone else besides the speaker(s) or the listener(s) as the agents or patients of a sentence. These three persons may be found in two grammatical numbers: singular and plural. Thus declined forms of personal pronouns reflect case, gender, person and number.

Most possessive pronouns have two distinct uses, though some have three.

1. A possessive pronoun can replace an article, which is why Colognian possessive pronouns can also be called possessive articles.
  - Example: et Auto → ding Auto (the car → your car)
2. Like a demonstrative pronoun, a possessive pronoun can stand alone representing an entire noun phrase. Its use can be exophoric or strict anaphoric; a cataphoric use must be resolved within the same or next sentence or sub-sentence.
  - Example: minge kanns de han (you can have mine)
3. One of the Cologinan genitives, namely the form having to precede its referent, can also be described as a possessive expression having the form: article-dative + noun-dative + possessive-pronoun-3rd person-nominative
  - Example: em Pap singe Poste (fathers post or position)

=== Pronoun declensions ===
Demonstrative pronouns	singular masculine	singular feminine	singular neuter	plural any gender
Nominative:	dä	die	dat	die
Genitive:	dämm sing(e) dämm sie	dä iehr(e)	dämm sing(e) dämm sie	dänne iehr(e)
Genitive:	vun dämm	vun dää	vun dämm	vun dänne
Dative:	dämm	dää	dämm	dänne
Accusative:	dä	die	dat	die
Vocative:	—	—	—	—

Relative pronouns	singular masculine	singular feminine	singular neuter	plural any gender
Nominative:	dä	die	wat	die
Genitive:	dämm sing(e) dämm sie	dä iehr(e)	dämm sing(e) dämm sie	dänne iehr(e)
Genitive:	vun dämm	vun dää	vun dämm	vun dänne
Dative:	dämm	dää	dämm	dänne
Accusative:	dä	die	wat	die
Vocative:	dä	die	wat	die

Stressed definite personal pronouns	1st person singular any gender	2nd person singular any gender	3rd person singular masculine	3rd person singular feminine	3rd person singular neuter	1st person plural any gender	2nd person plural any gender	3rd person plural any gender
Nominative:	isch	do	hä	sei	it	mier	Ühr	sei
Genitive:	ming(e) mie	Ding(e); Die	sing(e) sie	iehr(e)	sing(e) sie	onser uns	Ühr	iehr(e)
Genitive:	vun mier	vun dier	vun imm	vun ehr	vun im	vun uns	vun Üsch	vun inne
Dative:	mier	dier	imm	ehr	im	uns	Üsch	inne
Accusative:	misch	Disch	inn	sei	it	uns	Üsch	sei
Vocative:	isch	Do	—	—	—	mier	Ühr	—

Unstressed definite personal pronouns	1st person singular any gender	2nd person singular any gender	3rd person singular masculine	3rd person singular feminine	3rd person singular neuter	1st person plural any gender	2nd person plural any gender	3rd person plural any gender
Nominative:	esch	de	e	se	et	mer	er	se
Genitive:	ming(e) mi	ding(e) di	sing(e) si	iehr(e)	sing(e) si	onser(e) ons	öhr(e)	iehr(e)
Genitive:	vun mer vummer	vun der	vun em	vun er	vun em	vun ons	vun üsch	vun enne
Dative:	mer	der	em	er	em	ons	üsch	enne
Accusative:	mesch	desch	en	se	et	ons	üsch	se
Vocative:	—	—	—	—	—	—	—	—

Indefinite personal pronouns	3rd person singular male	3rd person singular female	3rd person singular neuter	3rd person plural any gender
Nominative:	eine wä	ein wä	ein wä	wälsche
Genitive:	einem sing(e) wäm sing(e)	einem sing(e) wäm sing(e)	einem sing(e) wäm sing(e)	wälsche iehr(e)
Genitive:	vun einem vun wäm	vun einem vun wäm	vun einem vun wäm	vun wälsche
Dative:	einem wäm	einem wäm	einem wäm	wälsche
Accusative:	eine wä	ein wä	ein wä	wälsche
Vocative:	—	—	—	—

Generalizing personal pronouns	3rd person singular any gender
Nominative:	mer
Genitive:	einem sing(e)
Genitive:	vun einem
Dative:	einem
Accusative:	eine
Vocative:	—

Impersonal pronouns	3rd person any number any gender
Nominative:	keine
Genitive:	keinem sing(e)
Genitive:	vun keinem
Dative:	keinem
Accusative:	keine
Vocative:	—

Possessive pronouns			1st person singular any gender	2nd person singular any gender	3rd person singular masculine	3rd person singular feminine	3rd person singular neuter	1st person plural any gender	2nd person plural any gender	3rd person plural any gender
s i n g u l a r	m a s c u l i n e	Nominative:	minge ~ mi ~	dinge ~ di ~	singe ~ si ~	ehre ~	singe ~ si ~	unse ~ ons ~	üüre ~	eere ~
s i n g u l a r	m a s c u l i n e	Genitive:	mingem ~ sing(e)	dingem~ sing(e)	singem ~ sing(e)	eerem ~ sing(e)	singem ~ sing(e)	onsem ~ sing(e)	üürem ~ sing(e)	eerem ~ sing(e)
s i n g u l a r	m a s c u l i n e	Genitive:	vun mingem ~	vun dingem ~	vun singem ~	vun eerem ~	vun singem ~	vun onsem ~	vun ührem ~	vun eerem ~
s i n g u l a r	m a s c u l i n e	Dative:	mingem ~	dingem ~	singem ~	ehrem ~	singem ~	onsem ~	ührem ~	ehrem ~
s i n g u l a r	m a s c u l i n e	Accusative:	minge ~ mi ~	dinge ~ di ~	singe ~ si ~	ehre ~	singe ~ si ~	unse ~ ons ~	üüre ~	eere ~
s i n g u l a r	m a s c u l i n e	Vocative:	minge ~ mi ~	dinge ~ di ~	singe ~ si ~	ehre ~	singe ~ si ~	unse ~ ons ~	üüre ~	eere ~
s i n g u l a r	f e m i n i n e	Nominative:	ming ~ mi ~	ding ~ di ~	sing ~ si ~	eer ~	sing ~ si ~	uns ~ ons ~	üür ~	eer ~
s i n g u l a r	f e m i n i n e	Genitive:	minger ~ iehr(e)	dinger~ iehr(e)	singer ~ iehr(e)	eerer ~ iehr(e)	singer ~ iehr(e)	onser ~ iehr(e)	üürer ~ iehr(e)	eerer ~ iehr(e)
s i n g u l a r	f e m i n i n e	Genitive:	vun minger ~	vun dinger ~	vun singer ~	vun erer ~	vun singer ~	vun onser ~	vun ührer ~	vun erer ~
s i n g u l a r	f e m i n i n e	Dative:	minger ~	dinger ~	singer ~	ehrer ~	singer ~	onser ~	ührer ~	ehrer ~
s i n g u l a r	f e m i n i n e	Accusative:	ming ~ mi ~	ding ~ di ~	sing ~ si ~	eer ~	sing ~ si ~	uns ~ ons ~	üür ~	eer ~
s i n g u l a r	f e m i n i n e	Vocative:	ming ~ mi ~	ding ~ di ~	sing ~ si ~	eer ~	sing ~ si ~	uns ~ ons ~	üür ~	eer ~
s i n g u l a r	n e u t e r	Nominative:	ming ~ mi ~	ding ~ di ~	sing ~ si ~	eer ~	sing ~ si ~	uns ~ ons ~	üür ~	eer ~
s i n g u l a r	n e u t e r	Genitive:	mingem ~ sing(e)	dingem~ sing(e)	singem ~ sing(e)	eerem ~ sing(e)	singem ~ sing(e)	onsem ~ sing(e)	üürem ~ sing(e)	eerem ~ sing(e)
s i n g u l a r	n e u t e r	Genitive:	vun mingem ~	vun dingem ~	vun singem ~	vun eerem ~	vun singem ~	vun onsem ~	vun ührem ~	vun eerem ~
s i n g u l a r	n e u t e r	Dative:	mingem ~	dingem ~	singem ~	ehrem ~	singem ~	onsem ~	ührem ~	ehrem ~
s i n g u l a r	n e u t e r	Accusative:	ming ~ mi ~	ding ~ di ~	sing ~ si ~	eer ~	sing ~ si ~	uns ~ ons ~	üür ~	eer ~
s i n g u l a r	n e u t e r	Vocative:	ming ~ mi ~	ding ~ di ~	sing ~ si ~	eer ~	sing ~ si ~	uns ~ ons ~	üür ~	eer ~
p l u r a l	a n y g e n d e r	Nominative:	ming ~ mi ~	ding ~ di ~	sing ~ si ~	eer ~	sing ~ si ~	uns ~ ons ~	üür ~	eer ~
p l u r a l	a n y g e n d e r	Genitive:	minge ~ iehr(e)	dinge~ iehr(e)	singe ~ iehr(e)	eere ~ iehr(e)	singe ~ iehr(e)	onser ~ iehr(e) onse ~ iehr(e) ons ~ iehr(e)	üüre ~ iehr(e)	eere ~ iehr(e)
p l u r a l	a n y g e n d e r	Genitive:	vun minge ~	vun dinge ~	vun singe ~	vun ere ~	vun singe ~	vun onser ~ vun onse ~ vun ons ~	vun ühre ~	vun ere ~
p l u r a l	a n y g e n d e r	Dative:	minge ~	dingr ~	singe ~	ehre ~	singe ~	onser ~ onse ~ ons ~	ühre ~	ehre ~
p l u r a l	a n y g e n d e r	Accusative:	ming ~ mi ~	ding ~ di ~	sing ~ si ~	eer ~	sing ~ si ~	uns ~ ons ~	üür ~	eer ~
p l u r a l	a n y g e n d e r	Vocative:	ming ~	ding ~ di ~	sing ~ si ~	eer ~	sing ~ si ~	uns ~ ons ~	üür ~	eer ~

== See also ==
- Colognian grammar
