= New High German =

Most recent period in the history of German

- Neuhochdeutsch
- Native to: Germany, Austria, Luxembourg, Liechtenstein, Switzerland, Netherlands,
- Language family: Indo-European: Germanic; West Germanic; German; High German; New High German
- Early forms: Old High German: Middle High German; Early New High German
- Writing system: German alphabet

Official status
- Official language in: Austria, Germany, Liechtenstein, Luxembourg, Switzerland, Belgium; European Union; Namibia until 1990.

Language codes
- ISO 639-1: de
- ISO 639-2: ger (B) deu (T)
- ISO 639-3: deu
- Glottolog: mode1258

New High German (NHG; German: Neuhochdeutsch (Nhdt., Nhd.)) is the term used for the most recent period in the history of the German language, starting in the 17th century. It is a loan translation of the German Neuhochdeutsch (Nhd.). The most important characteristic of the period is the development of a standard written German, followed by the standardisation of the spoken language. For this reason, the term New High German (or simply High German) is also used as a synonym for modern Standard German.

== Periodisation ==
The German term was originally coined in 1819 by Jacob Grimm for the period from around 1450 to the present day, following on from Middle High German (Mittelhochdeutsch). However, in 1878 Wilhelm Scherer proposed a transitional period, 1350–1650, for which he coined the new term Frühneuhochdeutsch (Early New High German), thus dating New High German from the mid 17th century. In spite of many alternative proposals, Scherer's remains the most widely adopted periodisation of German.

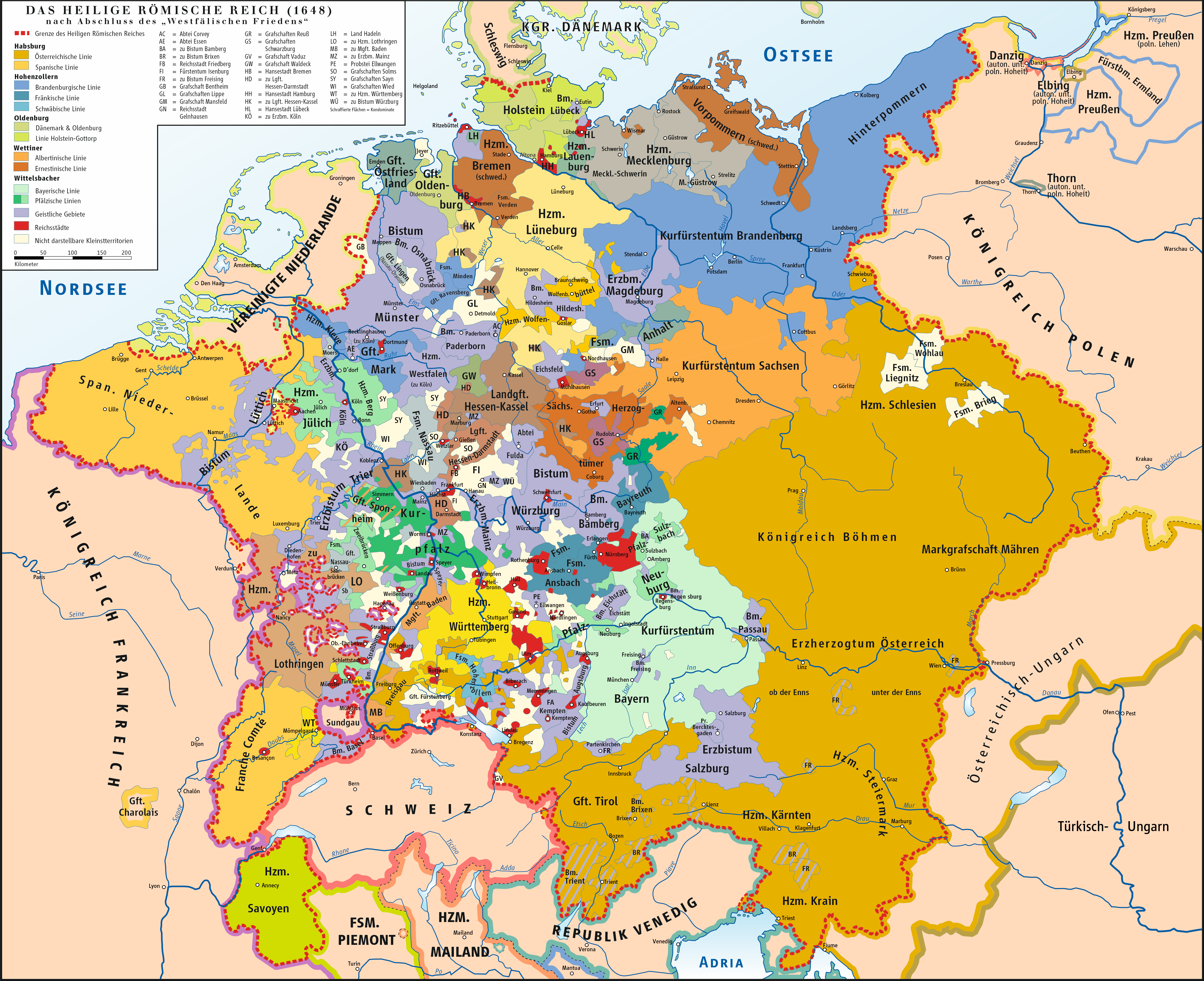
Map of Central Europe in 1648: Territories under the Holy Roman Empire, comprising the Alpine heartland (Erblande) of the Habsburg monarchy.

There are both linguistic and extra-linguistic reasons for regarding the mid-17th century as the beginning of a new linguistic period. By this time, the sound changes which result in the phonological system of Modern German had been completed—no further major changes take place within the NHG period. The Thirty Years War saw the population reduced by at least one third, and the subsequent Treaty of Westphalia, signed in 1648, guaranteed the relative independence of hundreds of small and large states within the Holy Roman Empire, as well as recognizing the complete independence of the Netherlands and Switzerland. The 1641 publication of Justus Georg Schottelius's Teutsche Sprachkunst marks the beginning of the debate about a standardized national language.

The New High German period is often subdivided, with a general consensus over a break in the first half of the 19th century, with another after 1945. The earliest of these periods, Older New High German (Älteres Neuhochdeutsch), sees the gradual establishment of a standard written language by grammarians, lexicographers, and writers; the second, Younger New High German (Jüngeres Neuhochdeutsch), sees the spread of this standard throughout the publishing media (and becoming an international language of science), into the schoolroom, and into spoken German. After 1945, the loss of German-speaking territory in the East, the decline of German as an international language, and the massive influence of English on the vocabulary are seen as markers of a new period, referred to as Gegenwartsdeutsch ("contemporary German"). These changes, however, are in the status and use of the language, while the phonology and morphology have seen only rationalisation and not substantial change over the last 370 years.

== Territory ==
Current distribution areas of the German language in Europe

For the first two hundred years of the period, the linguistic boundary of German remained relatively stable, even where the territory itself changed hands, as in Alsace, a French possession since the Treaty of Westphalia. The only major area of change was in the East. Initially only individual German-speaking settlers moved into the underpopulated lands of Brandenburg, Pomerania and Bohemia, but in the late 17th century both Prussia and Austria had policies of attracting settlers to these lands.

From the late 19th century, however, there have been significant losses of German-speaking territory. The eastward settlement of the earlier period was reversed by a Russian government policy of Russianisation and by the resistance of the Polish population to further German immigration, causing many German speakers to return West. At the end of the Second World War the German-speaking populations of Bohemia and the land east of the Oder-Neisse line, which became part of Poland, were forcibly expelled.

== Characteristics ==
The New High German period is characterised by the codification of German grammar and the development of a standard language in both writing and speech. Unlike earlier periods, there have been few major changes in phonology or morphology. Rather, the standard language has selected particular features and these choices have then exerted an influence on individual German dialects.

== See also ==
- German literature of the Baroque period

== Sources ==
- Besch, Werner; Wolf, Norbert Richard (2009). Geschichte der deutschen Sprache. Berlin: Erich Schmidt. ISBN 9783503098668.
- Grimm, Jacob; Grimm, Wilhelm (1854–1863). "neuhochdeutsch". Deutsches Wörterbuch. Leipzig: Hirzel.
- Grimm, Jacob (1819). Deutsche Grammatik. Göttingen: Dieterische Buchhandlung. Reprint
- Grimm, Jacob (1822). Deutsche Grammatik (2nd ed.). Göttingen: Dieterische Buchhandlung.
- Keller, R.E. (1978). The German Language. London: Faber and Faber. ISBN 0-571-11159-9.
- Penzl, Herbert (1975). Vom Urgermanischen zum Neuhochdeutschen : eine historische Phonologie. Grundlagen der Germanistik 16. Berlin: Erich Schmidt. ISBN 3-503-00790-3.
- von Polenz, Peter (2000). Deutsche Sprachgeschichte vom Spätmittelalter bis zur Gegenwart. Vol. I: Einführung, Grundbegriffe, 14. bis 16. Jahrhundert (2nd ed.). De Gruyter. ISBN 978-3110164787.
- von Polenz, Peter (1999). Deutsche Sprachgeschichte vom Spätmittelalter bis zur Gegenwart. Vol. II: 17. und 18. Jahrhundert (2nd ed.). De Gruyter. ISBN 978-3110143447.
- von Polenz, Peter (2013). Deutsche Sprachgeschichte vom Spätmittelalter bis zur Gegenwart. Vol. III: 19. und 20. Jahrhundert (2nd ed.). De Gruyter. ISBN 978-3110314540.
- Roelcke T (1998). "Die Periodisierung der deutschen Sprachgeschichte". In Besch W, Betten A, Reichmann O, Sonderegger S (eds.). Sprachgeschichte. Vol. 2 (2nd ed.). Berlin, New York: Walter De Gruyter. pp. 798–815. ISBN 3-11-011257-4.
- Scherer, Wilhelm (1878). Zur Geschichte der deutschen Sprache (2nd ed.). Berlin: Weidmann.
- Sonderegger, Stefan (1979). Grundzüge deutscher Sprachgeschichte. Vol. I. Berlin, New York: Walter de Gruyter. ISBN 3-11-003570-7.
- Wells, C. J. (1987). German: A Linguistic History to 1945. Oxford University Press. ISBN 0-19-815809-2.
- Young, Christopher; Gloning, Thomas (2004). A History of the German Language through texts. London, New York: Routledge. ISBN 0-415-18331-6.
