= Colognian grammar =

Grammar of the Colognian language or dialect cluster

Colognian grammar describes the formal systems of the modern Colognian language or dialect cluster used in Cologne currently and during at least the past 150 years. It does not cover the Historic Colognian grammar, although similarities exist.

Colognian has verbal conjugation and nominal declension.

The Colognian declension system marks nouns, pronouns, articles, and adjectives to distinguish gender, case, and number. There are the three grammatical genders called feminine, masculine, and neuter, and a special case most often treated as exceptions of neuter. Like the German declension, the Colognian declension system does not mark grammatical gender for its plural forms; plural can thus be treated similar to another gender in it formalism. Five grammatical cases are distinguished: nominative, genitive, dative, accusative, and vocative. Genitive has two variants, either of which can also be described as expressions using dative. Number is either singular or plural in declension.

The Colognian conjugation system has a few hundred individual types of grammatical conjugations, which mark verbs to distinguish person, number, voice, aspect, tense, mood, modality, etc. Colognian basic verbs are classified as strong, weak, or irregular. Independently, there are composite verbs, which are classified as either separable or inseparable. Colognian also has modal verbs and auxiliary verbs, each forming grammatical classes of their own. There are three persons, 1st person, 2nd person, and 3rd person. Number is either singular or plural in conjugations. Grammatical voice can be active, passive, or reflexive. Colognian has indicative and conjunctive moods, and there are also imperative and energetic mood, inferential and renarrative, none of which is completely developed. The aspects of Colognian conjugation include unitary-episodic, continuous, habitual-enduring, and gnomic. In Colognian, grammatical tense can be present tense, preterite tense or past tense, simple perfect or present perfect, past perfect tense, completed past perfect tense, simple future tense, or perfect future tense.

== Case system ==
Colognian distinguishes the four grammatical cases nominative, genitive, dative, and accusative. The genitive has two variants, both of which are compounds or expressions.

Colognian is a nominative–accusative language, more precisely a nominative–accusative–dative language.

=== Nominative ===
Nominative is the basic form of nouns, etc. It is used to mark the subject or agent in a clause, the verb of which is in the active voice. It marks the subject or patient in a clause, the verb of which is in the passive voice.

=== Genitive ===
The two variants of the genitive are compounds. They both contain declined forms identical to dative, plus additional elements. Genitives can only be used in conjunction with another noun, to which they refer. One genitive form in standard word order requires that noun to precede the genitive compound, while the other genitive form is required to follow the noun it refers to. Genitives express a stronger or weaker kind of possession, ownership, or belonging-to.

- Examples:
  - däm Päul sing Sofa (Paul's sofa)
  - dat Sofa vum Pitter (Peter's sofa)
  - däm Marie sing Sofa (Mary's sofa)
  - dä Tant Marie iehr lila Hötche (Auntie Mary's little purple hat)
  - dat Jeseech vun dä Frau Schmitz (Mrs. Smith's face)
  - ene Fläsch ehre Ring (a bottle's ring, the ring of a bottle)
  - et Föttche vun enem Pöttche (the rear side of a mug or jar or little pot or potty)

=== Dative ===
...

=== Accusative ===
The accusative marks the direct object of a transitive verb in a transitive sentence.

The accusative is also governed by some prepositions, and by some prepositions in conjunction with specific verb classes, which means that independent of other grammatical contexts, these prepositions make the referenced noun use the accusative form.

There is a class of adverbial expressions most often telling a time of an action or the place of a movement employing the accusative case. They always have an equivalent expression using a preposition + accusative.

Accusative forms in Colognian grammar are in all instances identical to their corresponding nominative forms. Where needed, potential ambiguities are reduced by prosodic elements of speech, but are extremely rare, since Colognian unlike elsewhere follows a strict subject–predicate–object (SPO) word order for transitive sentences in active and reflexive voices and predicate–subject–object (PSO) for questions. This makes it very distinct from German, where word order is more flexible. Because direct objects cannot occur in the passive voice, the accusative does not occur in passive sentences.

- Examples:
  - däm Päul sing Sofa (Paul's sofa)
  - dat Sofa vum Pitter (Peter's sofa)
  - däm Marie sing Sofa (Mary's sofa)
  - dä Tant Marie iehr lila Hötche (Auntie Mary's little purple hat)
  - dat Jeseech vun dä Frau Schmitz (Mrs. Smith's face)
  - ene Fläsch ehre Ring (a bottles ring, the ring of a bottle)
  - et Föttche vun enem Pöttche (the rear side of a mug or jar or little pot or potty)

=== Vocative ===
It could be argued that Colognian has a vocative, the forms of which is identical to the nominative with the articles stripped off. Most commonly, this case is seen as a part of the nominative. Since wishes can be expressed using vocative + imperative, this case is applicable to almost any noun and noun expression. Also, few specific verbs can require an object to use the vocative case.

- Examples:
  - Marie (Mary)
  - Köbes (waiter, keeper, Jacob)
  - Mamm (mum, mama, mother)
  - leev Bröck (dear bridge)
  - Pääd (horse)
  - mi Levve (my life)
  - do fies Knöllche (you bloody notice of a due payment for an observed traffic offense)
  - ich heißen Antunn (I am called Anthony)

== Gender system ==
There are three grammatical genders in Colognian: masculine, feminine, and neuter gender. Most nouns have fixed gender, but there is a class of nouns that can switch from predominantly neuter to feminine on certain occasions. Colognian shares this phenomenon with a large group of local and vernacular languages almost along the entire river Rhine. Very few nouns have an unclear gender.

=== Natural gender ===
Natural gender plays only a small role in Colognian grammar. While male persons or living beings customarily are referred to with the masculine gender, females are generally referred to using the neuter gender, with some exceptions mentioned below. However, if a person or animal is named or nicknamed with a meaningful Colognian noun, which is not uncommon, the noun's gender is used to determine articles accompanying the name, but otherwise the person's natural gender is used.

=== Unclear gender ===
There are very few Colognian nouns of unclear grammatical gender, which have therefore been used with varying gender. This may apply to neologisms for some time until a certain gender evolves for them.

== Number system ==
=== Number in declension ===
The singular is always used when there is exactly one instance of something or occasionally, depending on the ways such figures are expressed, with magnitudes having a "one" at their end, such as 1,001. The plural is used in all other cases, except with zero. Depending on the context and the noun, the singular or the plural is used with zero; sometimes either can be used, but most often, Colognian speakers choose their wording to avoid expressions of the type "zero + noun." ...

=== Number in conjugation ===
...

=== Singular ===
Singular is always used, when there is exactly one instance of something, or occasionally, depending on the ways, such figures are expressed, with magnitudes having a "one" at their end, such as 1001.

=== Plural ===
Plural is used for anything else but zero.

=== Zero ===
Depending on context and the noun, singular or plural is used with zero instances. Some nouns allow only one of them, other nouns allow that either can be chosen arbitrarily. Yet the actual choice then usually depends on aesthetic aspects of the sentence. Generally, this has little impact since most often Colognian speakers prefer wordings avoiding expressions ususing zero as a count.

== Verbs ==
...

=== Voices ===
Colognian conjugation has the voices: active and passive. Also, there is the reflexive which combines middle voice and mediopassive.

==== Active ====
...

==== Passive ====
...

==== Reflexive ====
The reflexive is used, when agent and patient of an action are identical. It can be seen as a middle voice which is both active and passive at the same time. There are few reflexive verbs that are used reflexively only. Many verbs, when used in their reflexive form, carry a connotation of self-contention, or of emotional profit for the agent/patient, there the aspect of being formally reflexive can also be seen as benefactive. Reflexive can also be mediopassive. Since this is predominantly used in generalized speech, semantics diverge from middle voice. Prosody may help to disambiguate. Grammatical forms are identical, however. ...

- Examples of mandatory middle voice reflexive:
  - Dat deiht sech bedde (She is praying)
  - Ech moot mech lääje (I had to lay down)
  - Ühr kännd Üch he nit uß (You do not know the ways here)
- Examples of optional middle voice reflexive :
  - Se drieht sech noch e Brütche ren (She eats another roll [for her pleasure])
  - Se kumme sech veraffscheede (They come to say goodbye)
  - It hät sech dud jesoffe (She died from alcohol abuse)
  - Mer hatte uns de Hand jejovve (We had shaken hands)
  - Ömdriehe däätet Er Üch! (You would turn [around])
  - Dat jeiht sech nit uß (It does not fit or work out)
- Examples of mediopassive reflexive:
  - Die Appelsine schälle sech joot (These Oranges peel well)
  - De Stunde lohße sesch nit ophallde (You cannot catch time)
  - Winter läät sech övver et Land (Winter covers the land)
  - Mer verköhlt sech ens jään (You likely catch a cold)
  - Verköhle deit mer sech jään (You likely catch a cold)
  - Verköhlt hät mer sech flöck (You likely catch a cold quickly)
- Examples of ambiguous reflexive:
  - Baade kann dä sech nit (He never takes a bath or refuses bathing / He cannot take baths)
  - Mer hellef sech met Bedde (Praying is supportive / One resorts to prayer / I've resorted to prayer)
  - Mer hellef sech (People support each other / One finds ways to get along)

== Bibliography ==
- Ferdinand Münch: Grammatik der ripuarisch-fränkischen Mundart. Cohen, Bonn 1904. (online)
  Reprinted with permission: Saendig Reprint Verlag, Wiesbaden 1970, ISBN 3-500-21670-6, under a license by Verlag Bouvier, Bonn.
- Fritz Hoenig: Wörterbuch der Kölner Mundart. second, extended edition, Cologne 1905.
- Alice Tiling-Herrwegen: De kölsche Sproch, Kurzgrammatik Kölsch-Deutsch. Bachem-Verlag Köln. 1st edition, 2002. ISBN 3-7616-1604-X
- Christa Bhatt, Alice Herrwegen: Das Kölsche Wörterbuch. Bachem-Verlag Köln. 2nd edition, 2005. ISBN 3-7616-1942-1
