= Coarticulation =

Concept in phonetics

Coarticulation in its general sense refers to a situation in which a conceptually isolated speech sound is influenced by, and becomes more like, a preceding or following speech sound. There are two types of coarticulation: anticipatory coarticulation, when a feature or characteristic of a speech sound is anticipated (assumed) during the production of a preceding speech sound; and carryover or perseverative coarticulation, when the effects of a sound are seen during the production of sound(s) that follow. Many models have been developed to account for coarticulation. They include the look-ahead, articulatory syllable, time-locked, window, coproduction and articulatory phonology models.

Coarticulation in phonetics refers to two different phenomena:

- the assimilation of the place of articulation of one speech sound to that of an adjacent speech sound. For example, while the sound /n/ of English normally has an alveolar place of articulation, in the word tenth it is pronounced with a dental place of articulation because the following sound, /θ/, is dental.
- the production of a co-articulated consonant, that is, a consonant with two simultaneous places of articulation. An example of such a sound is the voiceless labial-velar plosive /k͡p/ found in many West African languages.

The term coarticulation may also refer to the transition from one articulatory gesture to another.
