= Colognian dialect =

German dialect

Colognian
- Kölsch, Kölsch Platt
- Pronunciation: [kœ̂ɫːlɕ]
- Native to: Germany
- Region: Cologne and environs
- Language family: Indo-European: Germanic; West Germanic; High German; Central German; West Central German; Central Franconian; Ripuarian; Central Ripuarian; Colognian
- Early forms: Proto-Indo-European: Proto-Germanic; Frankish; Old High Franconian; Old Central Franconian; Historic Colognian

Language codes
- ISO 639-3: ksh
- Glottolog: kols1241

Colognian or Kölsch (pronounced [kœ̂lɧ], narrower [kœ̂ɫːʃ]; full name Kölsch Platt) is a small set of very closely related dialects, or variants, of the Ripuarian group of dialects of the Central German group. These dialects are spoken in the area covered by the Archdiocese and former Electorate of Cologne reaching from Neuss in the north to just south of Bonn, west to Düren and east to Olpe in northwest Germany.

== Name ==
In the Ripuarian dialects, "kölsch" is an adjective meaning 'from Cologne' or 'pertaining to Cologne', thus equivalent to "Colognian". Its nominalized forms (ene Kölsche, de Kölsche etc.) denote the inhabitants of Cologne. The word "Kölsch", without an article, refers to either the dialect or the local Kölsch beer. Hence the humorous Colognian saying: "Ours is the only language you can drink!"

== Speakers ==
In Cologne, it is actively spoken by about 250,000 people, roughly one quarter of the population. Almost all speakers are also fluent in standard or high German. It is widely understood in a region inhabited by some 10 million people (a conservative estimate).

There was a community of people who spoke a variety of Kölsch in Dane County, Wisconsin, United States.

== Area ==
There are local (decreasingly divergent) variants of Kölsch in the Quarters, most notably those only recently incorporated into the city, and the Hinterland. Sometimes, also the far more than 100 clearly distinct Ripuarian languages of Belgium, the Netherlands, and German Rhineland are incorrectly referred to as Kölsch, as well as the Rhinelandic regiolect. In fact, the regiolect is very different from Kölsch, being the regional variety of Standard German influenced only to a certain degree by the dialect. As such, many native speakers of the regiolect are in fact unaware of the fact that a “regiolect” exists, believing they speak plain Standard German.

== History and classification ==
In its modern form, it is of comparatively recent origin. It developed from Historic Colognian, but has been under the influence of New High German since the 17th century. It was also influenced by French during the occupation of the Left Bank of the Rhine under Napoleon Bonaparte from 1794 to 1815, and therefore contains some more words from and expressions pertaining to French than does Standard German. There are also phonological similarities with French, which however may be coincidental.

Kölsch is one of the variants of the Ripuarian dialects (not part of the Rhinelandic regiolect, rheinisch), which belong to West Middle German family. It is closely related to the lower Rhineland (niederrheinisch) and Moselle Franconian (moselfränkisch) dialects and combines some features of them, as well employing a variety of words hardly in use elsewhere. Common with the Limburgish language group and other Ripuarian languages, it has a phonemic pitch accent, referred to as the 'singing' Rhinelandic tone.

== Features in comparison to Standard German ==
This list shows only the most important differences. Most of these are not uniquely Kölsch, but true for all Ripuarian dialects.

- Kölsch uses [ɕ], [ɧ] or even [ʃ] instead of standard [ç], so when Colognians say "ich", it sounds more like "isch".
- The Standard German /ɡ/ phoneme is pronounced [j] in the beginning of a word, and [j], [ʁ], [ɕ] or [x] in other positions, depending on the syllable structure. This gives rise to the erroneous belief that "im Kölschen jibbet kein Je" (Rheinlander regiolect German: "In Colognian there is no "G"); in fact Colognian does have the phoneme /g/, just not where Standard German speakers expect: rigge "to ride" (German: reiten)
- Kölsch has three diphthongs pronounced [ei], [ou] and [øy], which are equivalent to but less frequent than [aɪ], [aʊ] and [ɔʏ] in the standard.
- Voiceless stops are not aspirated, in contrast to Standard German and most varieties of English (although there are some dialects in Scotland and Northern England where voiceless stops are not aspirated).
- The [l] sound is "darker" than in Standard German, and is replaced by [ɫ(ː)] throughout ("Kölsch": (Colognian) [kœ̂ɫːɕ]; (Standard German) [kʰœlʃ])
- Words with an initial vowel are not separated from the preceding word by a glottal stop.
- Kölsch has a larger vowel system than Standard German. In Standard German [ɔ] and [œ] are always short, [e], [o] and [ø] always long. In Kölsch all of these occur long and short, and the difference is phonemic.
- Vowel quality often differs between standard words and Kölsch words. Sometimes the standard has the more original form, sometimes Kölsch does. Standard [ɪ], [ʊ], [ʏ] often correspond to Kölsch [e], [o], [ø], and [iː], [uː], [yː] often correspond to [eː], [oː], [øː]. Standard [aɪ], [aʊ], [ɔʏ] often correspond to Kölsch [iː], [uː] and [yː], and [aː], [ɛː] often correspond to [ɔː] and [œː]. All of these patterns (and others to be found), however, have many exceptions and cannot be used to build Kölsch words blindly.
- Kölsch is even more non-rhotic than the standard. It often vocalizes "r" completely so that any hint of it is lost, e.g. std. "kurz", ksh. "koot".
  - When it does not vocalize an "r", it will often be pronounced more strongly than in German: Sport [ɕpɔxt] (often humorously spelled "Spocht"). This carries over into the Cologne accent of German.
- Being a Central German dialect, Kölsch has undergone some stages of the High German sound shift, but not all. Where the standard has "pf", Kölsch uses "p", as do Lower German and English. Compare: Standard German: "Apfel, Pfanne"; Kölsch: "Appel, Pann", English: "apple, pan". Moreover, where the standard has "t", Kölsch usually keeps the older "d": Standard German: "Tag, tun"; Kölsch: "Daach, donn"; English: "day, do".
- Kölsch has shifted stem-internal [b] and [f] to [v]. Again, this sound change is shared by Lower German and English. Compare: Standard German: "leben, Ofen"; Kölsch: "levve, Ovve"; English: "live, oven" (note that this does not affect [f] shifted from older [p], e.g. Kölsch "schlofe", English "to sleep").
- As a typically Ripuarian phenomenon, [d] and [n] have changed into [ɡ] and [ŋ] in some cases, e.g. std. "schneiden, Wein", ksh. "schnigge, Wing".
  - Specifically, Middle High German ît, îd, în /iːt iːd iːn/, ût, ûd, ûn /uːt uːd uːn/, iut, iud, iun /yːt yːd, yːn/ > Colognian igg, ugg, ügg; ing, ung, üng /ɪɡ ʊɡ ʏɡ, ɪŋ ʊŋ ʏŋ/. The similar change /nd/ to /ŋɡ/ was originally near-universal, but has been lost in several words, most likely due to Standard German influence. (Münch gives for examples fryŋ̄k, kiŋ̄k "friend", "child", where modern Kölsch has Fründ, Kind. (German: Freund, Kind)
  - The word "dütsch" (German), compare German deutsch, has also been influenced by surrounding dialects and the standard, and the fully Kölsch form *düksch is unheard of.
- In Kölsch, the final "t" after is dropped at the end of words followed by another consonant (except l, m, n, ng). When a vowel is added, a lost "t" can reoccur.
- In Kölsch the word-final schwa is dropped and the standard ending "-en" is often shortened to schwa. Therefore, Kölsch plurals often resemble Standard German singulars, e.g., std. "Gasse" > "Gassen", ksh. "Jass" > "Jasse" (alley, alleys).
- Kölsch has a reduced case system, where the genitive is lost. The accusative and nominative are merged (except with personal pronouns), in most cases taking the form of the nominative; std. "Der Mann läuft die Straße entlang; ich sehe den Mann", ksh. "Der Mann läuf de Stroß elans, ich sinn der Mann.". In the case of adjectives, including possessive pronouns, determiners and indefinite articles, Kölsch takes the form of the accusative; compare Standard German: "mein Mann, meine Frau"; to Kölsch: "minge Mann, ming Frau", originally *mingen Mann, minge Frau, cf. the German accusative meinen Mann, meine Frau; English: "my husband, my wife".
- Many regular verbs of Standard German have an irregular present tense form conjugation in Kölsch, e.g. the verb "stonn" (= std. "stehen" and English "to stand") is conjugated as follows: "ich stonn, du steihs, hä steiht, mir stonn, ehr stoht, se stonn".

== Use ==
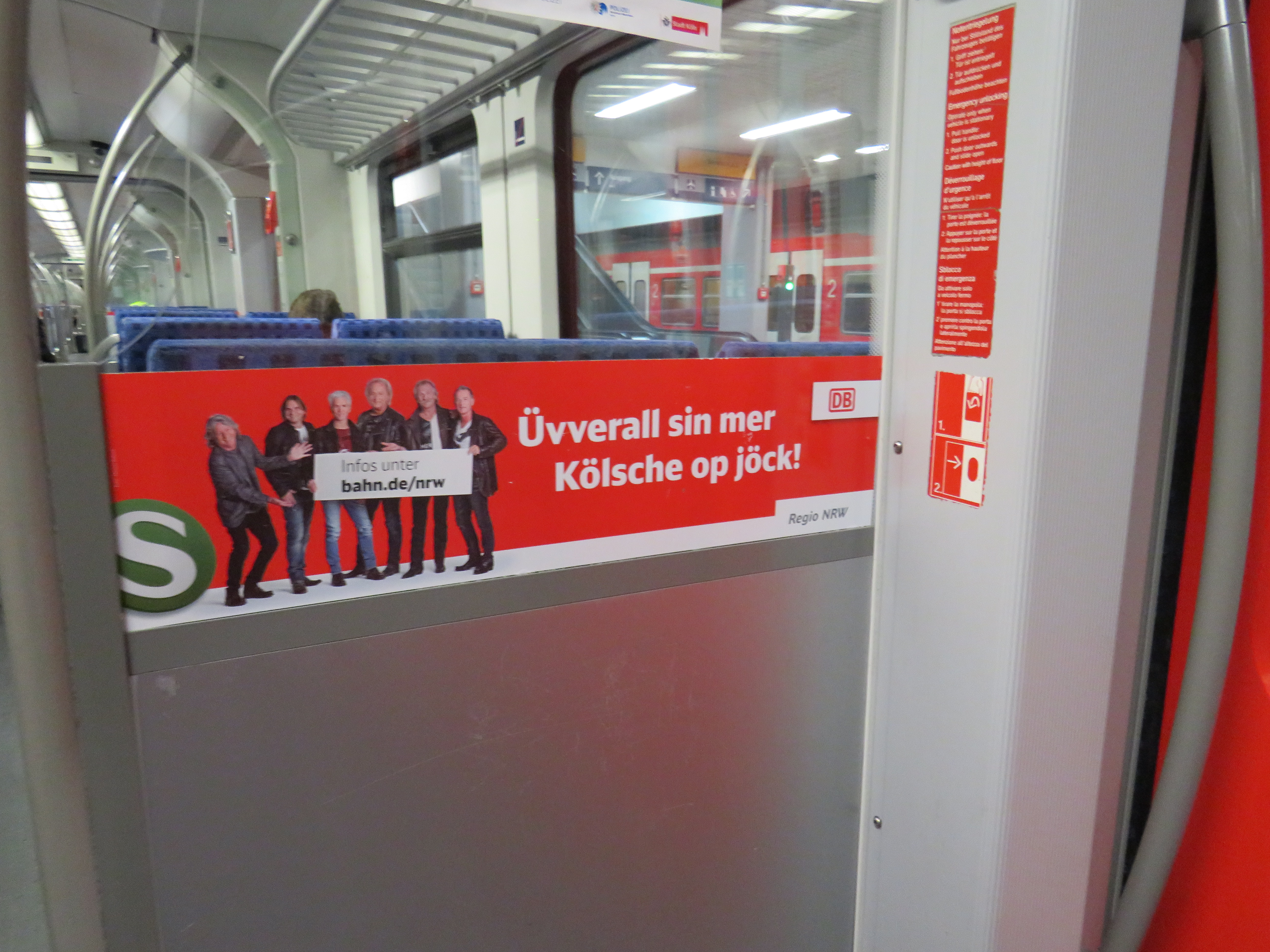
Colognian dialect on a sign on an S-Bahn train. Translation: "Everywhere, we Cologners are on the move!"

In comparison to most other German dialects, Kölsch is unusually well documented through the work of the Akademie för uns Kölsche Sproch and scholars such as Adam Wrede, whose publications include a dictionary, a grammar and a variety of phrase books. While Kölsch is not commonly taught in schools (although there are often extracurricular offerings) and a lot of young people do not have a proper command of it, many theaters exist that perform exclusively in Kölsch, most notably the Volkstheater Millowitsch, named after the late Willy Millowitsch (1909–1999) and the famous puppet theater, Hänneschen-Theater. There has also recently been an increase in literature written in this dialect and both traditional music and rock in Kölsch are very popular in and beyond Cologne, especially around Carnival, including bands such as Brings, The piano has been drinking..., Bläck Fööss, Höhner and others. The Kölsch rock group BAP is even among the most successful rock bands in Germany. Another noticeable phenomenon is the usage of either a watered-down Kölsch dialect or the Rhinelandic regiolect by German TV personalities, especially comedians such as Gabi Köster and others.

== The Lord's Prayer in Kölsch ==
This is a relatively recent, and modern, version of the Lord's Prayer in Colognian, by Jean Jenniches (1894–1979).

Nota bene: This is not a literal, but an artistic rendition of the Lord's Prayer.

Vatterunser

Leeve Herrjott, hellich ess Dinge Name.
Vum Himmel us rejeers Do et janze Weltall
noh Dingem Welle.
Wie ne Vatter sorgs Do för de Minschheit,
die he op de Äd Di Rich erwaden deit.
Vill Nut es en der Welt, dröm bedde mer:
maach doch, dat keine Minsch mieh muss
Hunger ligge.
Nemm vun uns alle Sündeschold,
domet och jederein ess jnädich de eije
Schöldner.
Helf Do uns, dat meer alle Versökunge
widderstonn,
un halt alles vun uns fähn, wat unsem
iwije Heil schade künnt.

Amen.

English translation:

Nota bene: This is not a literal, but an artistic rendition of the Lord's Prayer.

Our Father

Dear Lord God, holy is Your Name.
From the heavens You rule all the universe
according to Your will.
Like a father you care for humanity,
which awaits Your Kingdom here on Earth.
There is much need in the world, and thus we pray:
Make it so that no person should have to
suffer hunger anymore.
Take from us our debts,
so that every one of us is merciful to
his own debtors.
Help us to withstand all temptation,
and keep everything that could harm our
eternal salvation.

Amen.

== See also ==
- Aachen dialect (Öcher Platt)
- Bonn dialect (Bönnsch)
- Colognian declension
- Colognian grammar
- Colognian phonology
