= Matema Island =

Island in Solomon Islands

Coordinates: 10.293°S 166.184°E

Matema Island or Matema is of one of the Reef Islands in Temotu Province, of the independent nation of Solomon Islands.

The language spoken on Matema Island is Pileni, which is a member of the Polynesian language family. Pileni is also spoken on the islands of Pileni, Nupani, Nifiloli, Aua and Nukapu of the Reef Islands, as well as in the Taumako Islands (also known as the Duff Islands), some 200 miles to the east. Speakers are thought to be descendants of people from Tuvalu.
