= Nukapu =

Island in Temotu Province, Solomon Islands

Coordinates: 10.0818°S 166.0503°E

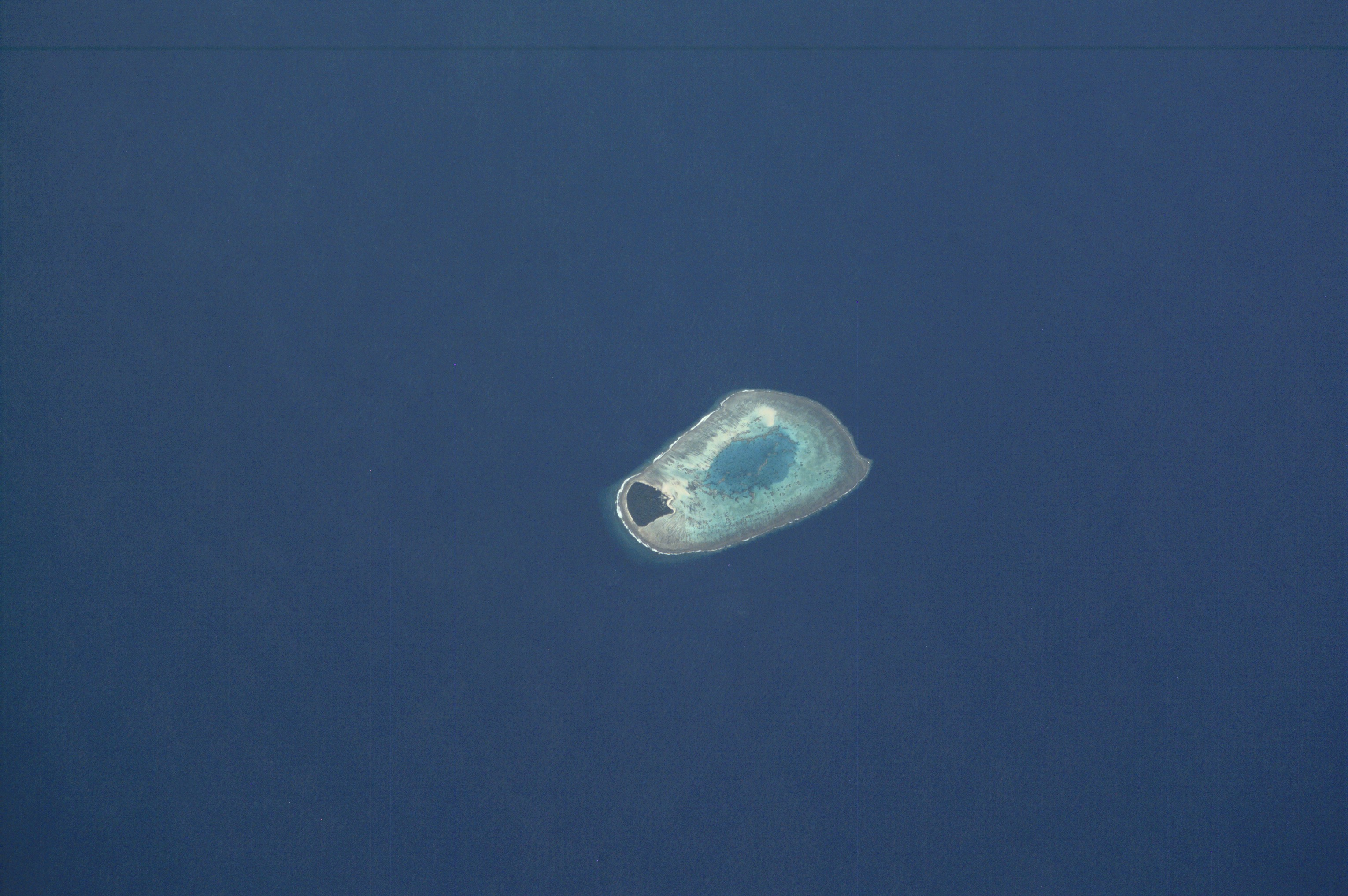
- NASA picture of Nukapu

Geography
- Location: South Pacific Ocean
- Archipelago: Reef Islands
- Area: 0.7 km^{2} (0.27 sq mi)

Administration
- Solomon Islands
- Province: Temotu Province

Demographics
- Population: 100 (2009)

Nukapu is one of the islands of the nation of Solomon Islands. It is in the Reef Islands group in Temotu Province; the easternmost province of the Solomons. The estimated terrain elevation above sea level is 15 metres.

The island contains a memorial to Bishop John Patteson who was murdered on Nukapu in 1871.

== Population ==
As of 2009, the local population was 100 people. The language spoken on Nukapu is Pileni, a member of the Polynesian language family. Pileni is also spoken on the islands of Pileni, Nupani, Nifiloli, Aua and Matema Island of the Reef Islands, as well as in the Taumako Islands (also known as the Duff Islands), some 200 miles to the east. Speakers are thought to be descendants of people from Tuvalu.

== See also ==
- Nukapu Expedition
