= Nibanga Temau =

Island in Solomon Islands

Coordinates: 10.266667°S 166.3°E

Nibanga Temau is the easternmost island of the Reef Islands located in Temotu Province of the independent nation of Solomon Islands. Nibanga Temau has a length of 3.4 kilometres. The nearest large island is Lomlom.
