= Tahua =

Island in Solomon Islands

Coordinates: 9°53′S 167°11′E

Tahua is one of the Duff Islands, of Temotu Province, in the independent nation of Solomon Islands. The estimated terrain elevation above sea level is some 23 metres. The island is inhabited.

== History ==
The artificial island of Tahua already existed when Portuguese explorer Pedro Fernández de Quirós discovered the Duff Islands on 8 April 1606. In the 1930s, Tahua Island measured only 100 by 150 metres, and walls divided the single village there. During the 1950s, the entire Duff Islands population lived on Tahua. The local people physically resemble Melanesians and speak a language called Pileni, that belongs to the Samoic branch of the Polynesian languages. The way of life is traditional by subsistence farming and fishing.
