= Äiwoo language =

Oceanic language spoken in Solomon Islands

Äiwoo
- Reef
- Pronunciation: [æiwoː]
- Native to: Solomon Islands
- Region: Santa Cruz Islands, eastern Solomons, Temotu Province.
- Native speakers: (8,400 cited 1999)
- Language family: Austronesian: Malayo-Polynesian; Oceanic; Temotu ?; Reefs – Santa Cruz; Äiwoo
- Writing system: Latin

Language codes
- ISO 639-3: nfl
- Glottolog: ayiw1239
- ELP: Äiwoo
- Coordinates: 10°13′S 166°12′E

Äiwoo (/ˈeɪ.woʊ, ˈaɪ.-/, AY-woh, EYE-) is an Oceanic language spoken on the Santa Cruz Islands and the Reef Islands in the Temotu Province of the Solomon Islands.

== Name ==
The Äiwoo language has been known under many names in the literature, including: Aŷiwo, Ayiwo, Aïwo, Gnivo, Lanlom, Lomlom, Naaude, Nifilole, Nivo, Reef Islands, and Reefs.

== Speakers and distribution ==
Äiwoo has roughly 8,400 native speakers with roughly 5,000–6,000 of these living on the Reef islands and the rest living on the Santa Cruz islands. As such, Äiwoo is the largest of the Reef Islands – Santa Cruz languages. Most speakers live on the Ngawa and Ngäsinue islands in the Reef Islands; others live in some villages on Vanikoro or on Nendö, like Kala Bay. Finally, some communities have recently been established in the capital Honiara, notably in the White River district.

== Sociolinguistics ==
On the Reef islands, Äiwoo is the primary language spoken by all of its people. Most of them also speak Pijin, the lingua franca of the Solomon Islands, while only a few people also speak English. The schooling system uses Äiwoo on the primary and secondary school level, though a standardized orthography for Äiwoo has not yet been adopted, resulting in a decline of people who can read and write.

== Phonology ==
=== Consonants ===
		Labial		Alveolar		Palatal	Velar
		plain	rounded	plain	sibilant	Palatal	Velar
Nasal		m	mʷ	n		ɲ	ŋ
Plosive or Affricate	voiced or prenasalized	b ~ ᵐb	bʷ ~ ᵐbʷ	d ~ ⁿd		d͡ʒ	ɡ ~ ᵑɡ
Plosive or Affricate	voiceless	p	pʷ	t	s ~ t͡s		k
Fricative or Approximant		ʋ ~ v	w	l	s ~ t͡s		

- Many words with the "rounded" nasal and plosives may be pronounced plain (without rounding) without changing word meaning.
- /t/ may also be pronounced as a tap [ɾ] or trill [r]. Their distribution is not clearly defined by Næss (2017).

=== Vowels ===
	Front	Central	Back
Close	i		u
Close-mid	e		o
Near-open	æ		
Open	a		ɑ ~ ɒ

== Orthography ==
Äiwoo uses a variation of the Latin alphabet. The following spelling conventions are taken from Næss (2017).

Äiwoo orthography	majuscule	A	Ä	Â	B	Bw	D	E	G	I	J	K	L	M	Mw	N	Ng	Ny	O	P	Pw	S	T	U	V	W
Äiwoo orthography	minuscule	a	ä	â	b	bw	d	e	g	i	j	k	l	m	mw	n	ng	ny	o	p	pw	s	t	u	v	w
IPA		a	æ	ɑ~ɒ	b~ᵐb	bʷ~ᵐbʷ	d~ⁿd	e	ɡ~ᵑɡ	i	d͡ʒ	k	l	m	mʷ	n	ŋ	ɲ	o	p	pʷ	s~t͡s	t~ɾ~r	u	ʋ~v	w

== Grammar ==
=== Syntax ===
Word order in Äiwoo varies by clause type. The canonical transitive clause follows an object–verb–subject (OVS) or "object–verb–actor" (OVA) order, where the nominal object precedes the verb and the actor is marked by a suffix. This is unusual for Oceanic languages and reflects an older undergoer-voice pattern.

==== Transitivity ====
Three verbal clause types are distinguished in Äiwoo: intransitive, transitive and semitransitive. Intransitive clauses involve only one participant, while transitive and semitransitive clauses involve more than one.

Intransitive clauses, formed with intransitive verbs, follow subject–verb (SV) order. Transitive clauses, corresponding to O-verb constructions, follow object–verb–subject (OVS) order, with the actor indicated by a suffix on the verb. Semitransitive clauses, corresponding to A-verb constructions, follow subject–verb–object (SVO) order, with the actor indicated by a prefix on the verb rather than a suffix. This mismatch in semitransitive clauses is called "transitivity discord": they are syntactically transitive but morphologically intransitive, and are typically used when focusing on the action itself rather than its effect on an object.

=== Morphology ===
==== Nouns ====
Nouns typically refer to objects and entities and lack articles and case-marking. They generally exhibit general number and can refer to single or multiple entities without changing form, as the language lacks an inflectional plural. However, several optional strategies exist to explicitly mark plurality, such as using the prefix pe- ('people') for specific groups or the independent plural word (i)jii.

===== Bound nouns =====
Bound nouns are a subtype that share the syntactic properties of regular nouns but cannot occur independently. They must be combined with a verb, a possessive marker or another noun.

===== Local nouns =====
Local nouns are another noun subtype, including place names and specific words like ngââgu 'bush'. They differ from regular nouns in that they can express location without requiring the preposition ngä.

I-ku-wä ngââgu.
1.MIN-IMPERF-go.INTR bush
"I'm going to the bush."

===== Possession =====
Nouns in Äiwoo are divided into those that are directly possessed (inalienable, such as body parts and kinship terms), which take possessive suffixes directly on the root, as in tumo 'my father', and those that are indirectly possessed (alienable). Indirect possession uses one of six semantic possessive classifiers that take person and number suffixes: food, drink, betel, utensils, house/land and general possession. In this construction, the possessive marker follows the noun and encodes both the possessor and the intended use of the possessed item, as in kuli nou 'my dog' or:

nenu numo
coconut 1.SG.POSS.CL.drink
"my coconut (to drink)"

===== Relational markers =====
Like possessive markers, relational markers follow a noun to indicate its relationship to another entity. However, rather than denoting possession, they express a relationship of belonging or being part of something.

sime lä nuumä
person REL village
"a person/people from the village"

===== Nominalising prefixes =====
There are about eight nominalising prefixes that attach to a verb complex to derive a noun, typically a concrete noun, with the notable exceptions of nye- and nyi-, denoting locative and action nouns respectively. These prefixes include:

Prefix	Meaning
mi-	'one who/which'
gi-	'human male'
si-	'human female'
me-	'human'
pe-	'human collective'
nye- (or ñe-)	'place'
de-	'thing, instrument'
nyi- (or ñi-)	'way, manner'

===== Class prefixes =====
Class prefixes attach to a noun or verb to derive a new noun denoting a member of the class encoded by that prefix. They often denote natural categories of plants, animals or tools (e.g., be- for basket, bo- for shark) and typically derive from independent nouns that have lost a fossilised article.

===== Gender-marking prefixes =====
Two of the nominalising prefixes, gi- and si-, also function as gender-marking prefixes. They attach to inalienable kin term stems to derive gendered human nouns. Their appearance in lexicalised combinations with these specific stems suggests they are of native Oceanic origin.

==== Verbs ====
Verbs in Äiwoo are divided into three main classes — intransitive verbs, A-verbs and O-verbs — whose distinction is morphologically defined. Intransitive verbs and A-verbs take a person prefix to indicate the actor, while O-verbs take a person suffix instead.

===== Intransitive verbs =====
Intransitive verbs occur with only one noun or pronoun to form a sentence and take a prefix to indicate the subject. The third-person augmented prefixes lu- and li- are positioned closer to the verb stem than other subject prefixes, following the aspect/mood markers rather than preceding them. Because of this, along with the first-person minimal prefix i-, they are considered the only surviving members of an older set of subject prefixes; most other subject prefixes are later innovations.

I-ku-wä.
1.MIN-IMPERF-go.VI
"I go."

===== A-verbs =====
Like intransitive verbs, A-verbs take a person prefix to indicate the actor. However, they also occur with an additional noun or pronoun indicating the object of the action.

I-ki-läke näte.
1.MIN-IMPERF-chop.VA firewood
"I'm chopping firewood."

===== O-verbs =====
Unlike A-verbs, O-verbs take a suffix to indicate the actor and similarly occur with a noun or pronoun indicating the object of the action. These transitive subject suffixes take on possessive-like forms. Unlike many Oceanic languages, which use a single set of prefixes to cross-reference both transitive and intransitive subjects, Äiwoo thus marks transitive subjects with suffixes rather than prefixes.

Nyenaa eângâ ki-läki-no.
tree DEM IMPERF-chop.VO-1.MIN
"I chop down the tree."

The realisation of the object in O-verb constructions depends on a hierarchy of person (2 > 1 > 3) and number (AUG > MIN). If the subject ranks lower than the object on these hierarchies, the verb exhibits a "marked" inverse alignment and takes an object agreement suffix. If the subject ranks higher, it uses the "default" direct alignment and the object is expressed as an independent pronoun.

===== Verb serialisation =====
Äiwoo frequently combines multiple lexical stems into a single inflected verb via verb serialisation, including head-modifier serialisation and complex-event serialisation, such as "cut and break" verbs.

===== Phonological structure =====
When pronounced in isolation, Äiwoo verbs do not begin with the sounds ⟨a⟩, ⟨ä⟩, ⟨â⟩ or ⟨o⟩. Many verbs start with the phoneme /e/ followed by another vowel, though the initial ⟨e⟩ is dropped after prefixes ending in -i (e.g., kiâmoli 's/he is looking', from eâmoli 'to look').

===== Causative formation =====
Causative verbs are a distinct class, all beginning with /v/ or /w/. They are derived by attaching a causative prefix, typically wâ- or vä-, to an existing verb:

wâ-nubo
CAU-die
"kill"

===== Tense, aspect and mood =====
Tense, aspect and mood (TAM) are marked on verbs: prefixes indicate mood (realis vs. irrealis) and aspect (perfective vs. imperfective), while enclitics attach to the end of the verb phrase to denote phasal aspects (such as progression) or future tense.

==== Pronouns and person marking ====
Pronouns replace nouns and follow a minimal-augmented pattern in lieu of a standard singular/plural system. This system treats 'you and I' as a distinct basic person category. Number categories include minimal (the smallest possible number for that person), unit-augmented (minimal plus one) and augmented (minimal plus more than one).

=== Minor word classes ===
==== Prepositions ====
There are two main prepositions in Äiwoo: ngä and go. The preposition ngä translates to 'in, at, on, to, from', while go corresponds to 'for, with, because of'.

==== Demonstratives ====
Äiwoo demonstratives can have several syntactic functions. All demonstratives distinguish between a 'here, close by' form and a 'there, far away' form.

==== Conjunctions ====
Conjunctions link phrases or clauses together, such as eä 'and'.

==== Quantifiers ====
While most words with quantifier-like meanings (such as numbers and du 'all') behave like verbs in Äiwoo, a small number of words pattern differently and form a distinct quantifier class, such as dä 'some'.

==== Interjections ====
Interjections are exclamatory words that can form a complete utterance on their own, such as sikäi! 'oh!'.

== Bibliography ==
- Lackey, William James; Boerger, Brenda H. (2021), "Reexamining the Phonological History of Oceanic's Temotu subgroup", Oceanic Linguistics, 60 (2), Honolulu, HI: University of Hawaiʻi Press: 367–411, JSTOR 27130651
- Næss, Åshild (2006), "Bound Nominal Elements in Äiwoo (Reefs): A Reappraisal of the 'Multiple Noun Class Systems'", Oceanic Linguistics, 45 (2): 269–296, doi:10.1353/ol.2007.0006
- Næss, Åshild; Boerger, Brenda H. (2008), "Reefs – Santa Cruz as Oceanic: Evidence from the Verb Complex", Oceanic Linguistics, 47 (1): 185–212, doi:10.1353/ol.0.0000, hdl:1959.13/1052427
- Næss, Åshild (2013), "From Austronesian Voice to Oceanic Transitivity: Äiwoo as the "Missing Link"", Oceanic Linguistics, 52 (1), University of Hawaiʻi Press: 107–124
- Næss, Åshild (2017), A short dictionary of Äiwoo, Studies in the Languages of Island Melanesia, Canberra, ACT: Asia–Pacific Linguistics, 1–203, hdl:1885/112469, ISBN 9781922185372
- Næss, Åshild (2018), "Plural-Marking Strategies in Äiwoo", Oceanic Linguistics, 57 (1): 31–62, doi:10.1353/ol.2018.0001, hdl:10852/67758
- Ross, Malcolm; Næss, Åshild (2007), "An Oceanic Origin for Aiwoo, the Language of the Reef Islands?", Oceanic Linguistics, 46 (2): 456–498, doi:10.1353/ol.2008.0003, hdl:1885/20053
- Roversi, Giovanni (2020), How to satisfy probes: person/number hierarchy effects in Äiwoo (PDF) (Manuscript / Conference Proceeding), University of Oslo
