= Ngawa =

Ngawa may refer to:

- Ngawa Tibetan and Qiang Autonomous Prefecture, in Sichuan, China
- Ngawa County, in Ngawa Prefecture
- Ngawa Town, seat of Ngawa County
- Ngawa Island, Solomon Islands
