= Tinakula =

Volcano and island in Temotu Province, Solomon Islands

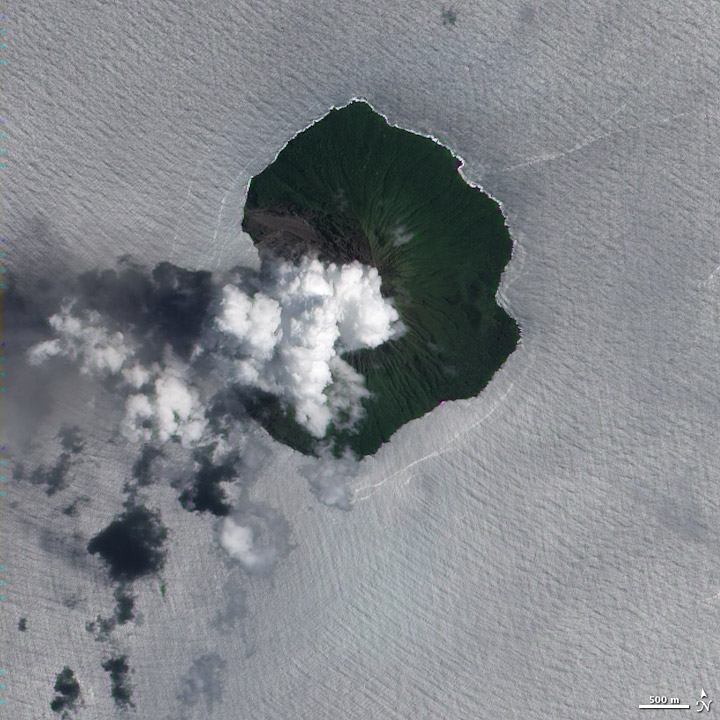
- NASA picture of Tinakula spewing ashes (2012)

Highest point
- Elevation: 851 m (2,792 ft)
- Coordinates: 10°23′S 165°48′E

Geography
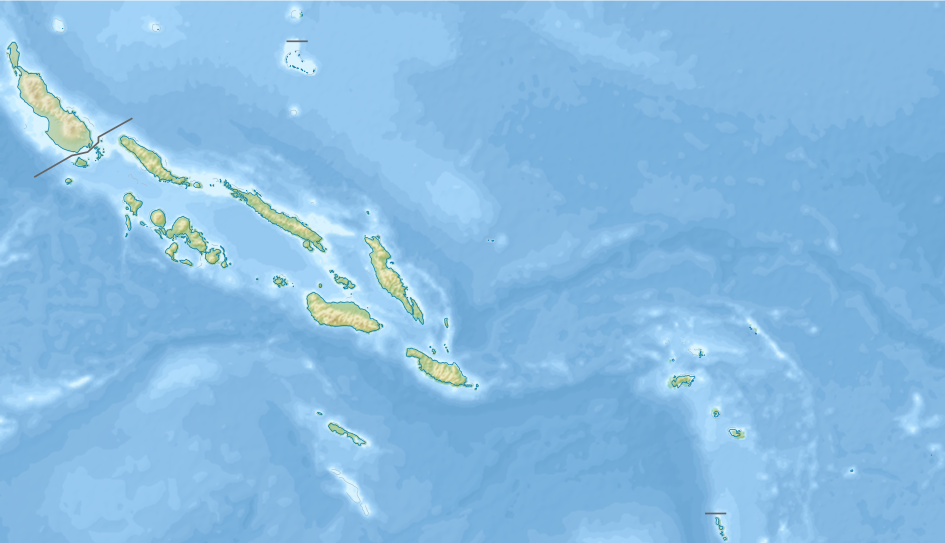
- Location within Solomon Islands
- Location: Solomon Islands

Geology
- Mountain type: Stratovolcano
- Volcanic zone: Solomon Islands
- Last eruption: March 2024 (Ongoing)

Tinakula is a conical stratovolcano which forms an island north of Nendo in Temotu Province, Solomon Islands. It lies at the north end of the Santa Cruz Islands. It is about 3.5 kilometres (2 miles) wide and rises 851 metres (2,792 feet) above sea level, rising three to four kilometres (1.9 to 2.5 miles) from the sea floor. The volcano was first recorded in eruption in 1595 when Spanish explorer Álvaro de Mendaña sailed past it during his second expedition across the Pacific Ocean. Tinakula has also been known in the past as Tamami or Volcano Island.

== Geology ==
Tinakula sits at the northern end of the New Hebrides island arc. This is a line of volcanic islands stretching between the Solomons and Vanuatu, formed by subduction of the Indo-Australian Plate beneath the Pacific Plate. The cone of Tinakula rises straight up from the seafloor, with a crater at the top. The volcano is composed mainly of andesite and basaltic andesite.

== History and occupation ==
The island is uninhabited. A population was eradicated when the volcano erupted around 1840 and pyroclastic flows swept all sides of the island. The island was reportedly inhabited in 1887. In 1951, Polynesians from Nukapu and Nupani settled on the island, reaching a peak population of 160 before the island had to be evacuated with the 1971 eruption. The village of Temateneni was on the southeast coast. In the late 1980s, two families (fewer than 10 people) from Nupani made another attempt at settlement.

The first recorded sighting by Europeans was by the Spanish expedition of Álvaro de Mendaña on 7 September 1595, when sailing towards Nendo Island where they stayed for several weeks. The volcano was described as lofty, with a well shaped peak, and a circumference of around 3 leagues (6.6km).

Captain Dillon of the HCS Research sailed past Tinakula while it was erupting in October 1827: "I spent the night between this island [Santa Cruz] and Thinnacoraw, alias the Volcano Island of Carteret which was in a state of ignition, and emitted at short intervals large quantities of burning lava that rolled down its strenuous sides in torrents".

There is a brief reference in the Melbourne Age newspaper of 10 November 1868 of the journey of the barque Tycoon, a ship carrying tea from Fuzhou to Melbourne for the Joshua Brothers. The ship, it states, "... passed Volcano Island, one of the South (Santa) Cruz Group, on the 17th of October (1868). It was then in active operation, vomiting forth immense volumes of fire and smoke."

In 1871, the British naval vessel Rosario passed by the island. It was noted that a stream of lava was flowing down the north-west side, while flames and smoke were emitted every 10 to 15 minutes.

The Whitney South Sea Expedition landed at Tinakula in March 1927 to collect bird specimens for the American Museum of Natural History. Frederick Drowne, one of the expedition members, described the erupting volcano:

I sat on deck and watched the crater on Tinakula pour lava or hot rocks down the N. W. side to the water's edge, a pretty sight which kept me up until 11 p.m. There must have been tons of material moving, for the red glow was plainly visible at ten or twelve miles distance, often extending in one red line all the way from the rim of the crater to the ocean. Ashes, very fine, reached our deck even at this distance. It seems rather strange to think of a volcanic island, some two miles in extent and somewhat over 2000 feet in height, all seething and boiling inside, and covered with luxuriant vegetation, with abundant bird life over two-thirds of its surface on all but the N. W. side.

== See also ==
- List of volcanoes in Solomon Islands
- List of islands
- Desert island

== References and sources ==
Sources

- "Tinakula". Global Volcanism Program. Smithsonian Institution.
