= Makalom =

Small island in Temotu Province, Solomon Islands

Coordinates: 10.1686°S 166.2002°E

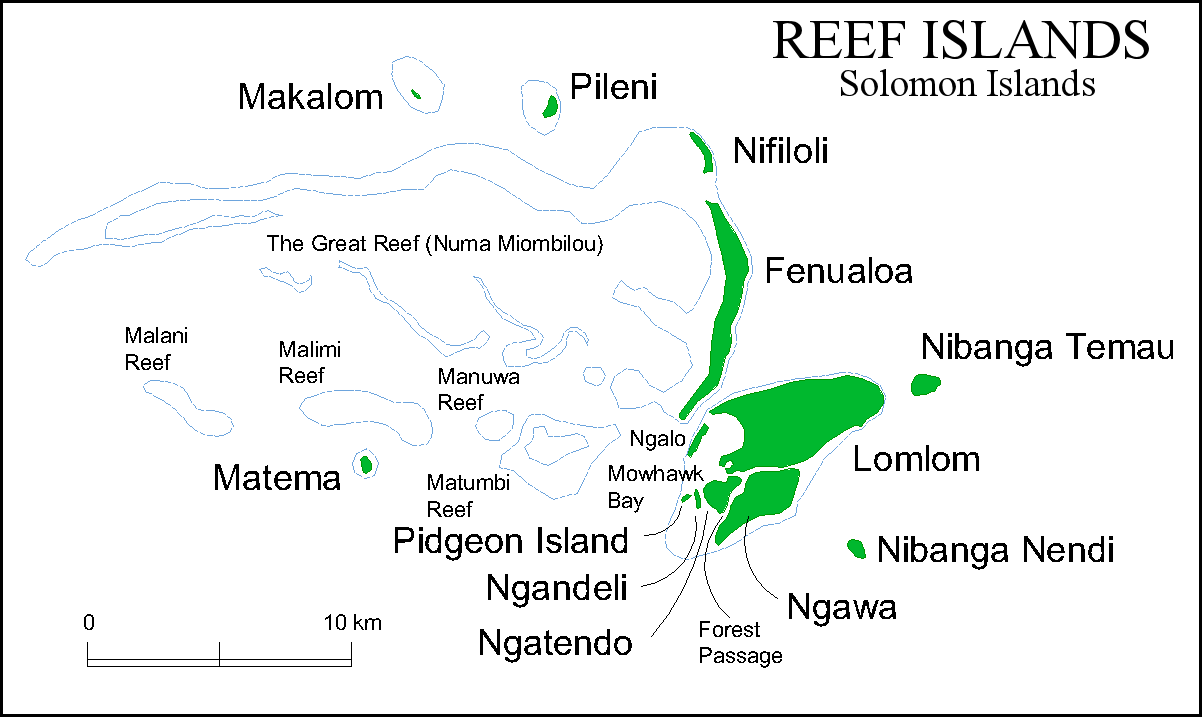
Map of the Reef Islands

Makalom is a small uninhabited island in the Reef Islands, in Temotu Province, in the nation of Solomon Islands. The island is 350 m long and 60 m wide, and is located on the south-west side of an oval-shaped atoll 2.5 km long and 1.5 km wide, some 4.8 km WNW of Pileni Island.

== See also ==
- Desert island
- List of islands
