= Ngandeli =

Island in Solomon Islands

Coordinates: 10°15′S 166°10′E

Ngandeli is one of the Reef Islands located in Temotu Province, in the independent nation of Solomon Islands.
