= Nibanga Nendi =

Island in Solomon Islands

Coordinates: 10.31667°S 166.28333°E

Nibanga Nendi is of one of the Reef Islands located in Temotu Province of the independent nation of Solomon Islands. The spelling of the island's name is various: Nibanga, Nimanu, Banga Ndeni.
