= Ngalo =

Island in Solomon Islands

Coordinates: 10.283333°S 166.266667°E

Ngalo is of one of the Reef Islands located in Temotu Province, in the independent nation of Solomon Islands.
