= Patteson Shoal =

Island in Solomon Islands

Coordinates: 9°43′S 166°7′E

Patteson Shoal is an outer reef in the Reef Islands, in Temotu Province, in the independent nation of Solomon Islands. It is located about 50 km northeast of Nupani. The shoal is named for John Coleridge Patteson.
