= Reef Islands =

Island group in Temotu Province, Solomon Islands

Coordinates: 10°15′S 166°10′E

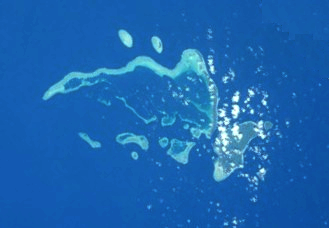
NASA picture of the Reef Islands.

The Reef Islands are a loose collection of 16 islands in Temotu Province, in the independent nation of Solomon Islands. These islands have historically also been known by the names of Swallow Islands and Matema Islands.

== Geography ==
The islands lie about 80 km (50 mi) north of Nendo, the largest of the Santa Cruz Islands. The center of the group is at approximately 10°12'36" S lat., 166°10'12" E. long. The islands are raised some five metres on the east and tilted west. The islands are subject to tidal surges caused by cyclones and volcanic activity from nearby Tinakula volcano. The island soils are shallow yet fertile.

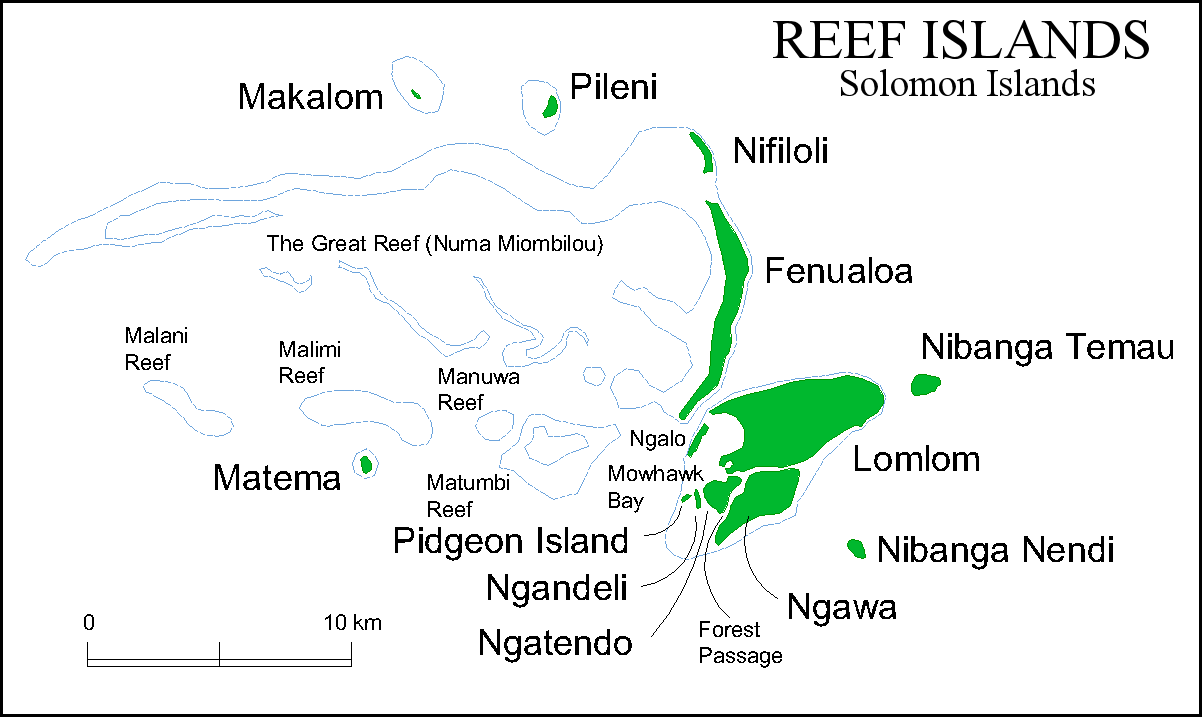
Map of the Reef Islands. Nukapu and Nupani are not shown, being further north-west of the main group.

The islands or atolls of the group are:

- Lomlom
- Nifiloli
- Fenualoa
- Ngalo
- Ngawa
- Ngandeli
- Nibanga Temau
- Nibanga Nendi
- Matema Island
- Ngatendo
- Pigeon Island.

Numa Miombilou or "Great Reef" is one continuous shoal, extending about 25 km (16 mi) west of Nifiloli. About 10 km (6.2 mi) to the south of this shoal are 4 small coral reefs:

- Malani
- Malim
- Manuwa
- Matumbi.

Separated from these groups are what are called the "outer islands":

- Nalongo and Nupani at 10°6'36" S. lat., 165°19'12" E. long., located at about 75 km (45 mi.) northwest of the main group
- Nukapu located about 35 km (21 mi.) to the northwest of the main group
- Makalom about 17 km (10 mi.) to the northwest of the main group
- Pileni about 9 km (5.5 mi.) to the northwest of the main group
- Patteson Shoal about 100 km (60 mi.) away from the main group

== Population and languages ==
The total population of the Reef Islands is about 5,600, according to 2003 estimates. This includes a Polynesian community, believed to be descendants of people from northern Tuvalu.

Two very different languages are spoken in the Reef Islands, both Oceanic, yet genealogically and typologically very different. The inhabitants of Pileni, Matema, Nupani and Nukapu, speak Vaeakau-Taumako (a.k.a. Pileni), a Polynesian outlier language. The remaining Melanesian (non-Polynesian) population speaks Äiwoo, a member of the Reefs–Santa Cruz group of Oceanic.

== See also ==
- Oceania
- Pacific Islands
- Pacific Ocean

== Other links ==
- Santa Cruz and the Reef Islands, 1908 account by W. C. O'Ferrall, Anglican missionary from 1897 to 1904.
