= Ngatendo =

Island in Solomon Islands

Coordinates: 10°15′S 166°10′E

Ngatendo is of one of the Reef Islands in Temotu Province, in the independent nation of Solomon Islands. The island is inhabited.
