= Pigeon Island (Solomon Islands) =

Island in Solomon Islands

Coordinates: 10.3035°S 166.2950°E

Pigeon Island is of one of the Reef Islands in Temotu Province, in the independent nation of Solomon Islands, 360 nautical miles from Honiara. The island is 274 by 91 metres. In local language the island is called Ngarando, which means a faraway place.
