= Vaeakau-Taumako language =

Polynesian language of Solomon Islands

Vaeakau-Taumako
- Pileni
- Region: Reef Islands and Taumako, Solomon Islands
- Native speakers: (1,700 cited 1999)
- Language family: Austronesian: Malayo-Polynesian; Oceanic; Polynesian; Futunic ?; Vaeakau-Taumako

Language codes
- ISO 639-3: piv
- Glottolog: pile1238
- ELP: Vaeakau-Taumako

Vaeakau-Taumako (formerly known as Pileni) is a Polynesian language spoken in some of the Reef Islands as well as in the Taumako Islands (also known as the Duff Islands) in the Temotu province of Solomon Islands.

The language is spoken throughout the Taumako Islands, while in the Reef Islands, it is spoken on Aua, Matema, Nifiloli, Nupani, Nukapu, and Pileni. Speakers are thought to be descendants of people from Tuvalu.

Vaeakau-Taumako was described by linguists Even Hovdhaugen and Åshild Næss, in the form of a dictionary and a grammar.

== Classification ==
Vaeakau-Taumako is a Polynesian outlier. Within that group, it has traditionally been considered one of the Futunic branch, but a 2008 study (exclusively based on lexical evidence) concluded that this membership is weakly supported.

== Phonology ==
=== Vowels ===
Vaeakau-Taumako does not vary from the standard Polynesian and Austronesian vowel system, featuring five vowels that can be used either in a long or short form. Short vowels found in word-final syllables are frequently devoiced or dropped, but long vowels in the same position are always stressed. There is little allophonic variation between vowel pronunciations.

Vowels
| | Front | Central | Back |
|---|---|---|---|
| Close | i iː | | u uː |
| Mid | e eː | | o oː |
| Open | | a aː | |

Vowel sequences in Vaeakau-Taumako are typically not treated as diphthongs, as they are not fully reduplicated, as shown in the word "holauhola". This is despite the vowels in the original word being pronounced like a diphthong.

=== Consonants ===
The Vaeakau-Taumako language has one of the most complex consonant system of the Polynesian languages, with 19 distinct phonemes, plus a large amount of variation across dialects. /b/ and /d/ are found primarily in loan words, rather being native to the language.

Aspirated sounds are characteristic of the language, and are typically strong and audible. However, the use of aspirated sounds varies across dialects, enough that it is difficult to identify a consistent pattern aside from noting they always occur at the start of stressed syllables.

| | | Labial | Coronal | Dorsal |
|---|---|---|---|---|
| Nasal | plain | m | n | ŋ |
| Nasal | aspirated | mʰ | nʰ | ŋʰ |
| Plosive | unvoiced | p | t | k |
| Plosive | aspirated | pʰ | tʰ | kʰ |
| Plosive | voiced | b | d | |
| Fricative | | v | s | h |
| Approximant | plain | | l | |
| Approximant | aspirated | | lʰ | |

== Morphology ==
=== Pronouns ===
Vaeakau-Taumako pronouns distinguish between 1st, 2nd and 3rd person pronouns. There are some inclusive and exclusive distinctions, and variations for singular, dual and plural in all cases. There are no gender distinctions. There is variation in the pronoun system for the dialects of Vaeakau-Taumako which can become quite complex, so for simplicity, only the general forms are recorded here.

==== Independent personal pronouns ====
There are two distinctive base sets of independent personal pronouns in Vaeakau-Taumako. The standard forms are used for formal occasions and recorded text, while the colloquial forms are typically found in informal, everyday conversation. (Note: p.99-100)

| | | Singular | Dual | | Plural | |
| | | Singular | standard | colloquial | standard | colloquial |
|---|---|---|---|---|---|---|
| 1st person | inclusive | iau, au | thaua | haua | thatou, thatu | hatou, hatu |
| 1st person | exclusive | iau, au | mhuaua | | mihatou, mhatu | |
| 2nd person | | koe | khoulua, kholua | houlua, holua | khoutou, khotou | houtou |
| 3rd person | | ia | lhaua | haua | lhatou, lhatu | hatou, hatu |

==== Bound subject pronouns ====
The language also features bound subject pronouns which act as clitics to the tense-aspect-mood marker of the verb of the constituent. They are not obligatory to use. The presence of the "u" has free variation by the choice of the speaker, but they are typically less prevalent in the colloquial forms. (Note: p.103-104)

| | | Singular | Dual | | Plural | |
| | | Singular | standard | colloquial | standard | colloquial |
|---|---|---|---|---|---|---|
| 1st person | inclusive | u=, ku= | tha(u)= | ha= | that(u)= | hat(u)= |
| 1st person | exclusive | u=, ku= | mha(u)= | | mhat(u)= | |
| 2nd person | | ko= | khol(u)= | hol(u)= | khot(u)= | hot(u)= |
| 3rd person | | ø | lha(u)= | ha= | lhat(u)= | hat(u)= |

==== Hortative pronouns ====
The dual, plural and 2nd person singular have specific pronouns used in imperative and hortative sentences. (Note: p.105)

| | | Singular | Dual | Plural |
|---|---|---|---|---|
| 1st person | inclusive | | ta | tatu, hatu, tatou |
| 1st person | exclusive | | ma | matu |
| 2nd person | | ko | lu | tu |
| 3rd person | | | la | latu, hatu |

==== Emphatic co-referential pronouns ====
When the subject and direct object of a sentence are the same thing, repetition of the independent pronoun in place of both argument positions is typically used. However, there is a set of emphatic coreferential pronouns used for the direct object to refer to someone or a group of people acting alone. (Note: p.106)

| | | Singular | Dual | Plural |
|---|---|---|---|---|
| 1st person | inclusive | okhoiau | okhitaua | okithatou |
| 1st person | exclusive | okhoiau | okhimaua | okimhatou |
| 2nd person | | okhoe | okhoulua | okhoutou |
| 3rd person | | okhoia | okhilaua | okilhatou |

==== The general pronoun nga ====
The word nga functions as a pronoun with specific use. It is a third person pronoun, but lacks specification for number, and is used to refer to both singular and plural referents. It typically is an anaphoric reference to a previously mentioned referent. (Note: p.106-107)

== Possession ==
=== Control ===
While it is common for Polynesian languages to distinguish between alienability and inalienability with a and o possessives, this is not the case for Vaeakau-Taumako. This distinction exists, however it instead marks control – not of the possessed item itself, but of the possessive relationship. (Note: p.109)

==== A-possessives ====
Relationships that can be initiated or terminated freely, such as items that can be bought, sold or given away at will are marked with the a-possessive.

==== O-possessives ====
Relationships that are outside of the possessor's personal control, such as body parts and kinship relationships are marked with o-possessives.

=== Alienability and inalienability ===
Instead of a- and o- possessives, alienability and inalienability in Vaeakau-Taumako are distinguished by the use of either prenominal or postnominal possessive pronouns. (Note: p.111)

==== Prenominal possessive pronouns ====
Prenominal possessive pronouns occur directly preceding the possessed nouns, and are typically used for inalienable relationships, such as kinship terms and body parts. (Note: p.112) Prenominal possessive pronouns distinguish between singular, dual and plural of the possessor. The singular possessive forms make an additional distinction between singular and plural of the possessed entity, and encode the a- or o-possessive directly. The dual and plural possessor forms are combined with the possessive prepositions a and o to express this distinction, or they may occur without a preposition.

| | | Singular | | Dual | Plural |
| | | Singular possessed | Plural possessed | Dual | Plural |
|---|---|---|---|---|---|
| 1st person | inclusive | taku, toku/tuku | aku, oku | (a/o) ta | (a/o) tatu |
| 1st person | exclusive | taku, toku/tuku | aku, oku | (a/o) ma | (a/o) matu |
| 2nd person | | tau, tō | au, ou/ō | (a/o) lu | (a/o) koto, (a/o) tu |
| 3rd person | | tana, tona, tena, na | ana, ona | (a/o) la | (a/o) latu |

==== Postnominal possessive pronouns ====
The postnominal possessive pronoun succeeds the possessed noun, and are used to mark alienable relationships, such as owned items. They make no distinction between singular and plural of the possessed item, instead the distinction is usually made through the choice of article preceding the possessed noun. Like with prenominal possessive pronouns, the postnominal possessives are based on the possessive prepositions a and o, plus a pronominal form indicating person and number of the possessor. In the singular form, this is the same set of suffixes found on the prenominal possessives, whereas in the dual and plural form, a distinct set of person and number forms are found. In the third and first person, these forms are identical to the independent personal pronouns, except for the lack of aspiration on the initial consonant. (Note: p.115)

| | | Singular | Dual | Plural |
|---|---|---|---|---|
| 1st person | inclusive | aku, oku | taua | tatou |
| 1st person | exclusive | aku, oku | maua | matou |
| 2nd person | | au, ou | aulua, oulua | autou, outou |
| 3rd person | | ana, ona | laua | latou |

=== Possessive suffixes ===
The possessive suffixes -ku (1st person), -u (2nd person) and -na (3rd person) apply to a restricted set of kinship nouns: tama/mha 'father', hina 'mother', thoka 'same-sex sibling', thupu 'grandparent', and mokupu 'grandchild'. These nouns cannot occur without possessive marking, they require either a possessive suffix or, in the dual and plural, a postnominal possessive pronoun. (Note: p.147) An alternative construction is for these nouns to take the 3rd person possessive suffix -na in combination with a prenominal possessive pronoun or possessive prepositional phrase. The form in -na must in such cases be understood as a neutral or unmarked form, since it may combine with a pronoun of any person and number; but a form in -na without any further possessive marking is unambiguously 3rd person. (Note: p.148) Nouns other than those previously mentioned do not take possessive suffixes, but instead combine with possessive pronouns. (Note: p.149.)

== Negation ==
Vaeako-Taumako displays negation in prohibitions (prohibitive, irrealis, imperfective, admonitive), statements (verbal and non-verbal) polar questions and noun phrases. Negation morphemes behave similarly to verbs in many respects although they do not take tense-aspect-mood markers or form independent predicates. (Note: p.397.) However, there are instances of their taking complement clauses and for this reason negation morphemes might be considered a sub-class of verb. (Note: p.385.)

=== Prohibition ===
Prohibitive clauses may be divided into two. Prohibitive auā, (equal to the English 'don't') and Admonitive na. Prohibitives pattern themselves in similar ways and are most frequently positioned cause initially. Admonitives behave and distribute slightly differently as will be illustrated below.

Negated clauses appear with only a small range of tense-aspect-mood markers. Prohibitive clauses often display no tense-aspect-mood marker at all, if they do, the markers are either na irrealis or me prescriptive. Negated declarative clauses typically occur with either perfective ne or imperfective no, with other options only marginally represented in collected data. (Note: p.386.)

==== Prohibitive auā ====
auā appears clause-initially, however discourse particles such as nahilā ('take care, make sure') may precede it. Other grammatical morphemes such as articles or markers of tense, aspect or mood may not precede it which excludes auā from the verb category of Vaeakao-Taumako.

auā t-a-u hano
PROH.SG SP-POSS-2SG.POSS go.SG
'Don’t go.'

However, auā behaves like a verb in that it may take clausal complements, which are then often either nominalised or the irrealis marker na is present (see table 1.1.3). A correlation exists between singular 2nd person subject and a nominalised clause although this correlation is not absolute. (Note: p.387.)

auā ko=no hualonga
PROH 2SG=IPFV {make noise}
'Don’t make noise!’ (Note: p.388.)

Contrasting this, the 2nd person dual or plural subjects attract the irrealis marker na to create a prohibitive clause.

auā kholu=na ō
PROH 2DU=IRR go.PL
'Don’t you (two) go!’

Within data sets of Næss, A., & Hovdhaugen, E. (2011), as implied by the imperative nature of the morpheme, auā will tend to appear with 2nd person subjects as above, although both 1st and 3rd subjects are also found.

1st Person

tatu noho themu, auā hat=no holongā
1PL.INCL.HORT stay quiet PROH PL.INCL=IPFV {make noise}
'We should all sit still and not be noisy.'

3rd Person

o ia auā no kute-a mai t-o-ku mata ia {a iau} auā t-a-ku kut-a ange o-na mata
CONJ 3SG PROH IPFV see-TR come SG.SP-POSS-1SG.POSS eye CONJ {PERS 1SG} PROH SG.SP-POSS-1SG.POSS see-TR go.along POSS-3SG.POSS eye
'She is not allowed to look at my face, 'and I cannot look at her face.'

Auā is also found in conjunction with modifiers such as ala which marks a hypothetical or oki, 'back, again'.

===== auā-ala =====
auā ala t-a-u fai-a e anga e tapeo i taha
PROH {HYP SG.SP-POSS-2SG} POSS do-TR. SG.NSP work GENR bad LDA side
'You should not do bad things outside.'

===== auā - oki =====
auā oki t-ō hai-a ange oki la mua nei oki la
PROH again SG.SP-2S.POSS do-TR go.along again DM.3 place DEM.1 again DM.3
'Don’t ever do that anymore here.'

===== Irrealis na and Imperfective no =====
Irrealis na and imperfective no adheres to a common pattern of appearing in 2nd person in dual or plural within prohibitive clause structure.

auā kholu= na
PROH 2DU=IRR go.PL
'Don’t you (two) go!’

Instances of 3rd person are less frequent and tend to include the imperfective no in postposition to morpheme auā.

a heinga auā no hū ite koe
COL thing PROH IPFV hidden LDA 2SG
'Nothing shall be hidden from you.'

===== Admonitive na =====
na behaves similarly to aluā only in that it is clause initial, it is otherwise classified as a clause initial particle and it must be accompanied by the tense-aspect-mood marker me which acts as a prescriptive. (Note: p.389.)

na me ta-ai te tangata
ADMON PRSC hit-TR SG.SP man
'Don’t kill the man!’

However na also has a second function, it acts to point out the consequences of disobeying the order. In this role the na often appears without me, creating a clause without tense-aspect-mood marking. (Note: p.390.)

Meri noho lavoi n me sepe
Mary stay good ADMON PRSC {expose oneself}
'Mary, sit properly, do not expose yourself.'

=== Statements ===
==== Verbal clause negation ====
Verbal negation is made up of three morphemes which act independently and may be understood as the English equivalents to siai 'not', sikiai 'not yet', and hiekhī 'not at all'.

===== siai 'not, no' =====
According to Næss, A., & Hovdhaugen, E. (2011) the colloquial pronunciation of siai is hiai, however the standard written form is siai. Siai comes after preverbal arguments but is placed before the tense-aspect-mood particle and following clitic pronoun.

ko ia siai ne longo ange ki a sina na
TOP 3SG NEG PFV listen {go along} to PERS mother 3SG.POSS
'She did not listen to her mother.' (Note: p.391.)

As in the case of auā modifying particles, which are traditionally found after verbs, may appear following siai. An example of this is loa which is an emphatic marker.

For example, siai loa.

e mae loa te kai ia siai oki ne-i fui-a o-na mata
GENR refuse EMPH SG.SP eat CONJ NEG again PFV-3SG wash-TR POSS-3SG.POSS eye
'He refused to eat, and he didn't wash his face either.' (Note: p.392.)

A further example is the addition of po which generally serves to connect a complement clause.

siai po ke ila~ila sika
NEG COM HORT REDUP~look straight
'She did not feel safe.' (Note: p.393.)

===== sikiai, hikiai 'not yet' =====
sikiai, hikiai (where sikiai is the formal written expression of spoken hikiai) appears in the same formation as above siai except it proceeds the preverbal argument and precedes any tense-aspect-mood markers. It appears less frequently and is often accompanied by the perfective marker ne. (Note: p.394.)

A Osil sikiai ne ala
PERS Åshild not.yet PFV wake
'Åshild is not yet up.'

===== hiekhī/hiekhiē 'not at all' =====
This is the emphatic form of the negator. It follows the same distribution as both sia and sikiai and is often accompanied by the post-nuclear modifier loa. (Note: p.395.)

hiekhī loa ne-i kute-a te ali na
not.at.all EMPH PFV-3SG see-TR SG.SP flatfish DM.2
'He couldn’t find the flatfish at all.'

As with siai hiekhī appears in conjunction with complementiser po, although with lower frequency.

a thatou hiekhiē po no kutea i mui thatu=no utu~utu ai na
PERS 1PL.INCL not.at.all COMP IPFV see-TR some place 1PL.INCL=IPFV REDUP~draw OBL.PRO DEM.2
'We had no idea where to draw water.'

==== Non-verbal clause negation ====
The same negators are used as in the verbal clauses above.

a Malani na siai e vai ai
then Malani DEM. NEG SG.NSP water OBL.PRO
'And Malani, there was no water there.' (Note: p.396.)

=== Questions ===
==== Polar questions ====
Polar questions are commonly formed in three ways. A declarative clause with a rise in intonation to mark the interrogative which requires the binary, 'yes' or 'no' response, much as they are in English may be used. The second alternative is the addition of the verbal negator (o) siai ‘(or) not' and the third is the addition of verbal negator sikiai (not yet) if the interrogative has a temporal element. (Note: p.398.)

Simple interrogative formed with declarative clause:

tha=ka ō mua?
1DU.INCL=FUT go.PL just
'Shall we go?’

(o) siai

E ai mua etai ne au o sai
GENR exist just person PFV come CONJ NEG
'Has anyone come here?’ (Note: p.399.)

sikiai

a hina-na ko-i taku-a ange po ke hano mua oi kute-a mua a thaupē po ka lanu o sikiai
PERS mother-3SG.POSS INCEP-3SG say-TR go.along COMP HORT go.SG just CONJ see-TR just PERS lagoon COMP FUT rise CONJ not.yet
'His mother told him to go and see if the tide was rising yet.'

=== Noun phrase negation ===
==== Negated existence ====
Non-specific article e can be used to express 'negated existence' unless the noun has a possessive marker in which case e is absent. (Note: p.166.)

siai loa e mahila k=u kapakapa ai i hale
NEG EMPH SG.NSP knife HORT=1SG work OBL.PRO LDA house
'There is no knife for me to use in the house.' (Note: p.167.)

== Spatial deixis ==
Spatial deixis is primarily expressed through demonstratives and directional forms in Vaeakau-Taumako. These spatial-deictic forms "allow the speaker to point to spatial locations" and encode the context of utterances or speech events. Interestingly, demonstrative and directional usage in Vaeakau-Taumako is particularly unique for a Polynesian language. This illustrates that spatial deixis is an especially important feature of Vaeakau-Taumako grammar. Demonstratives and directionals are discussed in more detail below.

=== Demonstratives ===
Vaeakau-Taumako demonstratives comprise a three-term system which is summarised below:

Figure 1 (Note: p. 121)
| Demonstrative | English Translation |
|---|---|
| ne(i) | 'here, close to speaker' |
| na | 'there, close to addressee, some distance away' |
| la | 'there, away from both speaker and hearer, quite far away |

Overall, these demonstratives have not only nominal and adverbial uses, but are also used in various capacities to structure discourse. The demonstrative particles also occur in more complex forms (see verbal demonstratives and deictic adverbs below).

==== Historical context ====
Vaeakau-Taumako demonstratives have cognates in other Polynesian languages. These demonstratives are also consistent with what has been reconstructed for Proto-Polynesian and Proto-Oceanic. These linguistic reconstructions are summarised below:

Figure 2
| Language | 1st person | 2nd person | 3rd person |
|---|---|---|---|
| Proto-Oceanic | *ni/*ne | *na | *ra(i) |
| Proto-Polynesian | *ni/*nei | *na | *ra |
| Tongan | e-ni | e-na | ia |
| Irafa-Mele | -nei | nā | rā |
| Vaeakau-Taumako | ne(i) | na | la |
| Samoan | (le)nei | (le)nā | le(lā) |
| Marquesan | nei | nā | ʔā, aʔā |

Furthermore, in the following discussion it will become evident that Boumma Fijian shares multiple linguistic traits with Vaeakau-Taumako. Therefore, it is possible that Boumma Fijian may be more closely related to Vaeakau-Taumako than other Polynesian languages.

==== Speaker-based system ====
The Vaeakau-Taumako demonstrative system is speaker-based: the location of the hearer or speaker serves as reference point for where the relevant object is located. (Note: p. 122) Denny summarised this succinctly in describing this system as one that centers space on the speaker or other participant. In Vaeakau-Taumako, 'ne(i)’ reflects an object’s proximity to the speaker, 'na' reflects an object’s proximity to the hearer and 'la' reflects distance from both the speaker and hearer, or a third party in the conversation.

This three-way distinction is so common in Oceanic languages that it is "virtually certain" that Proto-Oceanic also adopted a person-based demonstrative system. On a global scale, this three-way contrast is the second most common demonstrative system in the languages listed on The World Atlas of Linguistic Structures(WALS), with a two-way contrast being the most common system.

Vaeakau-Taumako's speaker-based system can be rationalised by the geographic context in which it is spoken. As the language is spoken on islands in the Solomon Islands, the speakers inhabit relatively small environments that do not have naturally defined reference points to describe space. To compensate for this, demonstratives are instead based on the speakers and hearers who are in the "immediate speech situation".

==== Distance-based system ====
However, discourse analyses of current demonstrative usage indicates that the system may be shifting to one that is distance-based and therefore not dependent on the speech-act participants. This is summarised below:

Figure 3
| Demonstrative | English Translation |
|---|---|
| ne(i) | 'here, close by' |
| na | 'there, some distance away; neither very near nor very far' |
| la | 'there, far away' |

'Na' is generally the preferred neutral choice of demonstrative to refer to an object that is neither far nor close. Therefore 'na' is not only used in direct conversations to illustrate proximity with a speech-participant (e.g. 'that one near you'), but it is also used in narratives as a medial term of a distance-based system. In these narrative contexts, 'na' refers to an object that is distance-neutral or medium-distance. This dual purpose of 'na' is not completely unique to Vaeakau-Taumako as Boumaa Fijian also adopts a "mixed" system.

==== Demonstrative pronouns ====
Demonstratives in Vaeakau-Taumako can be used as heads of noun phrases that are comparable to the English phrases 'this one' and 'that one'. In this capacity, the demonstrative is often preceded by the articles 'te' (indicating singularity) or 'ngha' (indicating plurality). This is typical for a Polynesian language. The following example shows the demonstrative 'na' ('that'), being used in conjunction with the prefix 'te' to denote singularity:

Ko te-na e ika efa.
TOP ART-DEM ART Fish bg.
'That is a big fish.'

Furthermore the following example shows the prefix 'ngha' attaching to the demonstrative 'la' ('those') to indicate plurality:

Ngha-la a hahine e toko-lua ma te memea e ko-tahi
PL.SP-DEM.3 COL woman GENR CL-two CONJ SG.SP child GENR PREF-one
'There were two women and a child (literal meaning: those ones, the women were two and the child was one).’ (Note: p. 123)

Alternatively, the demonstratives can occur as a free-standing lexical item (i.e. without the need for preceding articles). This more unique aspect of Vaeakau-Taumako is exemplified in the following clause:

Na e kio
DEM ART chicken.
‘That is a chicken'.

When acting as heads of nouns, the demonstratives may also be used anaphorically to refer to previously mentioned objects/participants in the conversation. The demonstratives can therefore serve the same purpose as a third-person pronoun (see Figure 4.4 below). Cross-linguistically this is not common, with the 100 of the 225 languages on WALS having language systems where third person pronouns are unrelated to demonstratives.

ila mua a nohine a-u la nga te-la ia
look just PERS wife POSS-2SG.POSS DEM.3 PN.3 SG.SP-DEM.3 3SG
'Look, that is your wife there.'

==== Demonstrative adjective ====
Demonstratives also function to modify a noun phrase in Vaeakau-Taumako. They can be used with nouns or pronouns and can function as a deictic or anaphoric reference. (Note: p. 124) The following example shows how the demonstrative 'na' ('that') is suffixed to the noun 'mhe' ('man') for a deictic purpose:

a mhe-na ko=ne lau-a i hea na
PERS man-DEM.2 2SG=PFV find-TR LDA where DEM.2
'Where did you find that man?’

This second example shows how the demonstrative 'ne' can be used as an anaphoric reference:

thai lhatou e Diuku te tai ne e ingoa ko Diuku
one 3PL SG.NSP Diuku SG.SP person DEM.1 SG.NSP name TOP Diuku
'One of them was Diuku, this man is called Diuku.' (Note: p. 125)

When a demonstrative is used with a pronoun, the demonstrative often (but not always) corresponds with the speech-act participant that is being referred to in the respective pronoun. Therefore 'ne' will be generally used with first person pronouns, 'na' will be used with second person pronouns and 'la' will be used with third person pronouns. However, 'na' can also be adopted as a neutral particle that is used interchangeably with third person and second person pronouns. (Note: p. 126)

==== Local adverbial demonstratives ====
Demonstratives in Vaeakau-Taumako also function as local adverbs that modify a verb and indicate the location in which the respective action occurs:

a thatu=e ilo-a po a kio no tahao ne i nghauta
PERS 1PL.INCL=GENR know-TR COMP COL chicken IPFV stroll DEM.1 LDA shore
'We know that chickens wander around here, on land (as opposed to the sea).’

When being used in this adverbial capacity, the demonstratives also have temporal-deictic references to refer to time (i.e. 'now' and 'then'): (Note: p. 127)

ilhatu=ne ta-ia i mua ne a-na ko ia u=ka tala~tala-a atu ne
3PL=PFV hit-TR LDA place DEM.1 then-DEM.2 TOP 3SG 1SG=FUT REDUP~tell-TR go.out DEM.1
'They killed him in this place, I will tell you about it now.'

==== Verbal demonstratives ====
In Vaeakau-Taumako, the formal class of adverbs is limited, so manner adverbial demonstratives with the meanings 'do/be like this, do/be like that' are regularly utilised. (Note: p. 128) These verbal demonstratives are cross-linguistically rare, however Boumaa Fijian and Dyirbal also exhibit similar forms. For example, in Fijian 'eneii' functions like the verbal demonstratives in Vaeakau-Taumako. The Vaeakau-Taumako forms are created by attaching the prefix 'p(h)e' to the core demonstrative particles:

Figure 7.1
| Adverbial demonstrative | English Translation |
|---|---|
| phenē | 'do/be like this' |
| phenā | 'do/be like that' |
| phelā | 'do/be like that' |

This first example shows the adverbial demonstrative 'phe-ne' being used to convey the meaning 'do like this':

noho phe-ne
sit like-DEM.1
'Sit like this!’

Secondly, verbal demonstratives also function to mean 'be the same as, in the same way':

e phe-na mai i Kahula hano mai ki nghauta
GENR like-DEM.2 come LDA Kahula go.SG come to shore
'It was the same as in Kahula, he went to the village there' (Note: p. 129)

Thirdly, the verbal demonstratives can function as modifiers of nouns to mean 'an X like that' (Figure 7.4) or 'a certain X' (Figure 7.5):

thatu=no he-henga ange e niu boho e taveli a hinga phe-na
lPL.INCL=IPFV REDUP~search go.along SG.NSP coconut young SG.NSP banana COL thing like-DEM.2
'We have looked for coconuts, bananas, things like that.'

po lhatu=ka ta-pena ala la i te langi phe-la
COMP 3PL=FUT PREP-prepare HYP DEM.3 LDA SG.SP day like-DEM.3
'They were to be ready on a certain day.'

This complex three-way distinction in which verbal demonstratives can be used is not only uncommon cross-linguistically, but it is also atypical among the languages which do have similar verbal demonstrative systems. Dyirbal and Boumaa Fijian only adopt a single verb to denote 'do it like this' in comparison to Vaeakau-Taumako's three-way system.

==== Deictic adverbs ====
Vaeakau-Taumako also has deictic adverbs that are formed by applying the prefixes 'a-’, 'i-'or 'e-’ to the core demonstrative particles. (Note: p. 130) These forms are summarised below:

Figure 8.1
| Proximal | Medial/neutral | Distal |
|---|---|---|
| anē 'and now' | anā 'and then' | alā 'and then' |
| inē 'here, now' | inā 'there, then' | Ilā 'there, then' |
| | enā 'somewhere there' | |

It is worth noting that 'ena' ('somewhere there') appears to only have a spatial reference. Furthermore the usage of 'ena' seems restricted to colloquial contexts: (Note: p. 132)

a ko-i taku-a ange po ī e-na na po ni vai ai
then INCEP-3SG say-TR go.along COMP INTRJ PREF-DEM.2 DEM.2 COMP PL.NSP Water OBL.PRO
'And he said, "Oh, somewhere here there is water".’

==== Demonstratives in discourse ====
Demonstrative particles commonly occur at the end of phrases. This applies to a variety of phrase types, with the following examples illustrating how 'na' can occur phrase-finally in a noun phrase (Figure 9.1), a verb phrase (Figure 9.2) and an adverbial phrase (Figure 9.3): (Note: p. 432)

te hahine na ko le~lek~ake na
SG.SP woman DEM.2 INCEP REDUP~go~go.up DEM.2
'The woman went up.'

ko hano na e kau~kau i thaupē na
INCEP go.SG DEM.2 GENR REDUP~swim LDA lagoon DEM.2
'He went and bathed in the lagoon.' (Note: p. 433)

matea atiao ala na thatu=ka ō atu mua hangota i Malimi
maybe tomorrow HYP DEM.2 lPL.INCL=FUT go.PL go.out just fish LDA Malimi
'Maybe tomorrow we will go fishing at Malimi.'

Beyond deictic and anaphoric uses of demonstratives (which have been discussed above), another core use of demonstratives is for phrase demarcation. Demonstratives occur at the end of a phrase as a means of marking the phrase boundary and situating the phrase within the overarching context of the clause. (Note: p. 436) In Vaeakau-Taumako, demonstratives are commonly used to indicate that there is a link between the demonstrative-marked phrase and the succeeding speech. It is often used in conjunction with rising intonation to indicate that "more is coming" (Figure 9.4 below). Similar demarcative particle morphemes are used in the Outlier East Futuna with the particle 'la'.

mhatu=ne ō ake na' ioko a lakau na ko pae ino ki te ala na, e takoto na e tapeo loa
lPL.EXCL=PFV go.PL {go up} DEM.2 CONJ COL tree DEM.2 INCEP scatter fall to SG.SP path DEM.2 GENR lie DEM.2 GENR bad EMPH
'We went up, and the trees, they were scattered all over the road, they were lying there, it was very bad.'

=== Directionals ===
In addition to demonstratives, Vaeakau-Taumako also has a set of morphemes that indicate verbal deixis (i.e. the physical or metaphorical direction in which an action is being carried out). There are six morphemes which can be divided into two categories (Figure 1.1 and 1.2). The directionals are best described as verbs that are most commonly used as part of a verbal nucleus, following one or more verbs. The first category of Vaeakau-Taumako directionals is summarised below: (Note: p. 133)

Figure 1.1 - Person-based directionals (indicate direction relative to speech-act participants)
| Directional | English translation |
|---|---|
| mai | Towards speaker |
| atu | Towards hearer |
| ange | Towards hearer |
| ange | Away from both speaker and hearer, toward a third person, along |

The following example shows 'mai' ('towards speaker') following another verb and marking the direction in space in which the act is occurring (i.e. towards the speech-act participants):

me le-mai na o kake
PRSC go-come DEM.2 to climb
'Come here and climb aboard (the canoe).' (Note: p. 140)

The second category of directionals is summarised below:

Figure 1.2 - Directionals that denote direction on a vertical axis
| Directional | English translation |
|---|---|
| ake | 'up' |
| iho | 'down' |
| oho | 'vertical movement, up or down' |

The following examples show 'iho' ('down') and 'oho' ('up or down') following another verb and marking the vertical direction in which the respective verb occurs:

tatu noho iho i te lakau a ngha lepū na
lPL.INCL.HORT stay go.down LDA SG.SP tree POSS PL.SP rat DEM.2
'Let us sit down on the rafter of the rats.' (Note: p. 135)

Noho oho ki lalo
stay go.vertically LDA under
'Sit down!’

==== Independent usage ====
Directionals may also be used as independent verbs, with 'iho' and 'oho' being the most commonly used forms. (Note: p. 134) When used as independent verbs, 'iho' means 'go down' (Figure 2.1) and 'oho' means 'move vertically; rise up; go down' (Figure 2.2):

Ko iho ma ia e thū
INCEP go.down with 3SG GENR stand
'She went down with it and stood (there)’.

lhatou ko oho lhatou ko iho oho ki nghauta
3PL INCEP go.vertically 3PL INCEP go.down go.vertically to shore
'They went down and came to the village.'

Furthermore 'mai' can function as an independent verb to mean 'come' (Figure 2.3). This commonly occurs in imperative clauses, which is typically how cognates of 'mai' in related Polynesian languages are also used.

lhatu=ko ha-haloki oho po mai tatu la-ina i nghauta
3PL=INCEP REDUP-call.PL go.vertically COMP come lPL.INCL.HORT sun-TR LDA shore
'They called to him, "Come here, let us sunbathe on the shore.'" (Note: p. 136)

It is also interesting to note that 'mai' can not only encode a literal direction, but also a metaphorical 'social' direction. In the example below (Figure 2.4), 'mai' denotes 'towards me' in a metaphorical sense that is 'for me; for my benefit; on my behalf': (Note: p. 142)

oi-na mai a iau
help-TR come PERS 1SG
'Help me!'

Lastly 'atu' also functions an independent verb which means 'move out, go away'. This is shown in the below example (note: 'poi' is a prenuclear modifier that precedes verbs):

a koe poi atu
PERS 2SG little go.out
'You get away! You move out!'

==== Historical context ====
Vaeakau-Taumako directionals have cognates in most other Polynesian and Oceanic languages. The corresponding reconstructed forms in Proto-Oceanic were directional verbs that occurred either independently or in serialisation constructions with another verb. The reflexes of these forms occur in modern Oceanic languages in variety of formal word classes. For example, in Tuvaluan, 'mai' ('hither'), 'atu' ('thither'), 'aka' ('up') and 'ifo' ('down') have been classified as adverbs, while directionals are categorised as 'particles' in Somoan.

== Abbreviations ==
The abbreviations used in the above examples are listed below:

=== Grammatical glosses ===
ADMON admonitive
AG agentive marker
APPL applicative suffix
BEN benefactive
CAUS causative prefix
CLASS classifier
COL collective
CONI conjunction
COMP complementizer
DEM demonstrative
DES desiderative
DIST distributive
DU dual
DY dyad particle
EMPH emphatic particle
EXCL exclusive
FUT future
GENR general tense-aspect -mood marker
HORT hortative
HYP hypothetical particle
INCL inclusive
INCEP inceptive
INTRJ interjection
IPFV imperfective
IRR irrealis
LDA locative-directional-ablative
NEG negative
NMLZ nominalizing suffix
NSP nonspecific
OBL.PRO oblique pro-forru
OPT optative
PERS personal marker
PFV perfective
PL plural
POSS possessive
PP predicative possessive particle
PREF prefix; gloss uncertain
PROH prohibitive
PN pronoun
PRSC prescriptive
PST past
RECP reciprocal
RED reduplication
SG singular
SP specific
TOP topicalizing preposition
TR transitive suffix
VOC vocative
I 1st person
2 2nd person
3 3rd person

=== Lexical categories ===
adj adjective
adv adverb
gn geographical narue
In local noun
n, en corrnnon noun
part particle
pron pronoun
prep preposition
quant quantifier
VI intransitive verb
vsem semi-transitive verb
vt transitive verb

== Notes ==
- References from Næss, Åshild; Hovdhaugen, Even (2011). A Grammar of Vaeakau-Taumako. Berlin: De Gruyter Mouton. ISBN 978-3-11-023826-6.:
- Other sources

== Bibliography ==
- Næss, Åshild; Hovdhaugen, Even (2011). A Grammar of Vaeakau-Taumako. Berlin: De Gruyter Mouton. ISBN 978-3-11-023826-6..
- Hovdhaugen, Even (2006). A Short Dictionary of the Vaeakau-Taumako Language. Oslo: Kon-Tiki Museum, Institute for Pacific Archaeology and Cultural History..
