= Nukapu Expedition =

1871–72 British punitive expedition in the Solomons

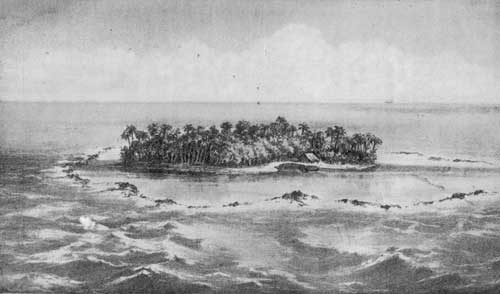
- Nukapu c. 1870
Date	October 1871 – February 1872
Location	Nukapu, Solomon Islands
Result	British victory

Belligerents
Royal Navy	Nukapu natives

Commanders and leaders
Albert Hastings Markham	Unknown

Casualties and losses
1 killed, 2 wounded	20–30 killed

The Nukapu expedition was a British punitive expedition from October 1871 until February 1872, in response to the murder of missionary John Coleridge Patteson by natives of Nukapu, one of the easternmost islands of the Solomon Islands in the South Pacific Ocean. A Royal Navy warship was sent to the island, sinking a group of hostile war-canoes and landing men to attack a fortified village.

== Expedition ==
In October 1871, the screw sloop-of-war HMS Rosario was operating against blackbirders in the South Sea Islands when her captain, Commander Albert Hastings Markham, received orders to sail for Nukapu in the Solomon Islands. The measures taken by Rosario became the subject of questions in the House of Commons, and Markham's book on the subject may well have been prompted by them. The book itself makes clear that Markham clearly understood the cycle of violence and deplored both the murderous activities of the blackbirders, and the apparent need for further violence in restoring order.
