= Fenualoa =

Island in Solomon Islands

Coordinates: 10°15′S 166°15′E

Fenualoa is the second largest island in the Reef Islands, in Temotu Province, in the nation of Solomon Islands.

== Name ==
The name is of Polynesian origin (fenua loa), meaning "long land".

== Geography ==
The estimated terrain elevation above sea level is some 17 metres. At low tide, Fenualoa is connected to the neighboring island of Nifiloli to the north. The west side of the island is mainly sandy beaches facing the huge lagoon and the Great Reef. The east side is steep rocky cliffs with the deep Forest Passage separating Fenualoa from the largest island of the group Lomlom.

== Population ==
The island is very densely populated with four main villages, each made up of sub-villages and total approximately 1500 inhabitants (2008), all on the west side of the 8 km by 600m long and thin island. The largest villages are Tuo (Tuwo), Maluba, Tanga and Malapu (running south to north). There are three schools on the island and the people are Melanesian. A few yachts (1 or 2 per year) visit the island by entering the huge lagoon through the Great Reef (the lagoon is approximately 25 km east west by 8 km north south). There is no scheduled transport to the island.

== Gallery ==
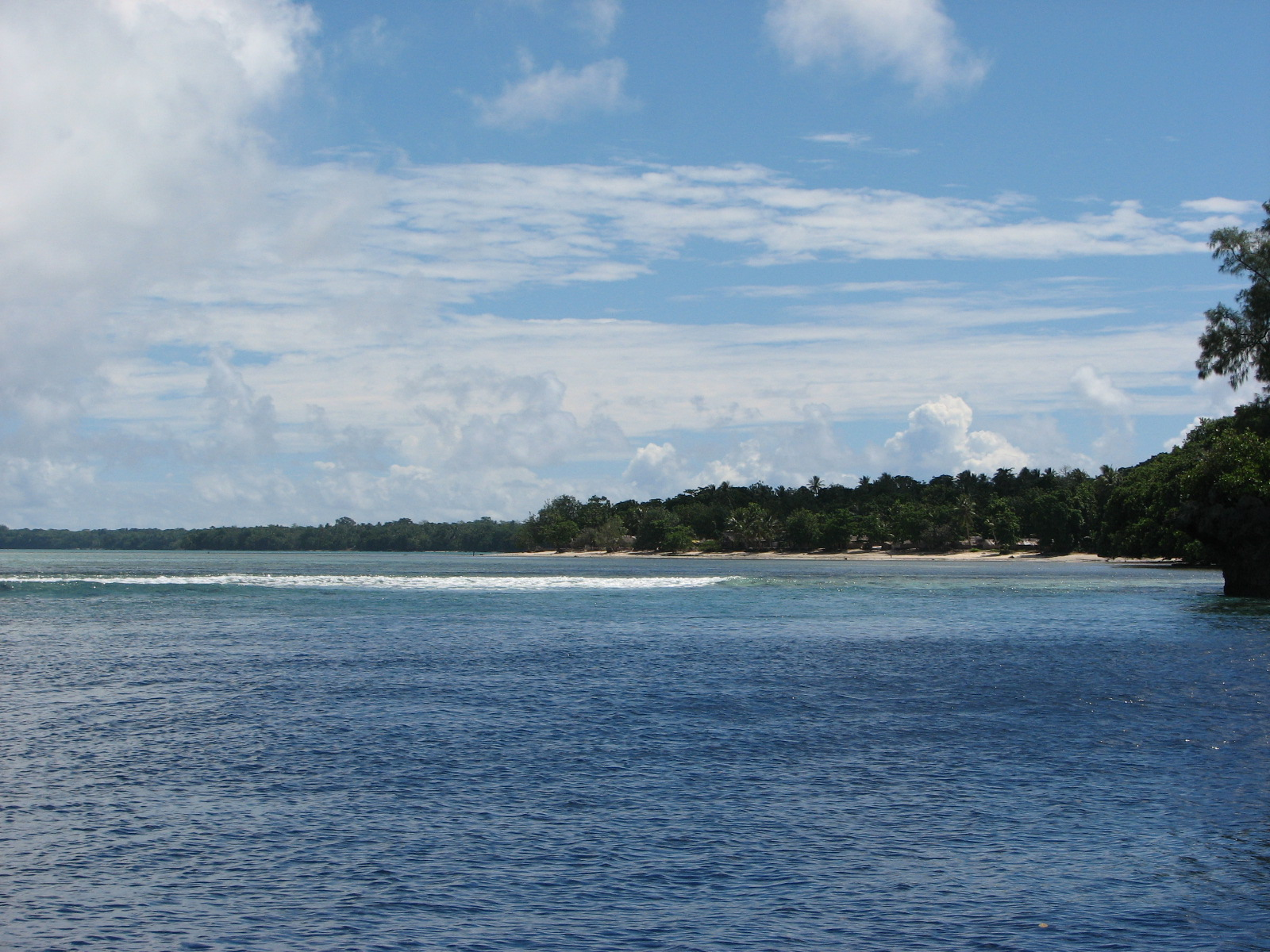
Looking north to Fenualoa from just outside the reef. Tuo village is just visible.

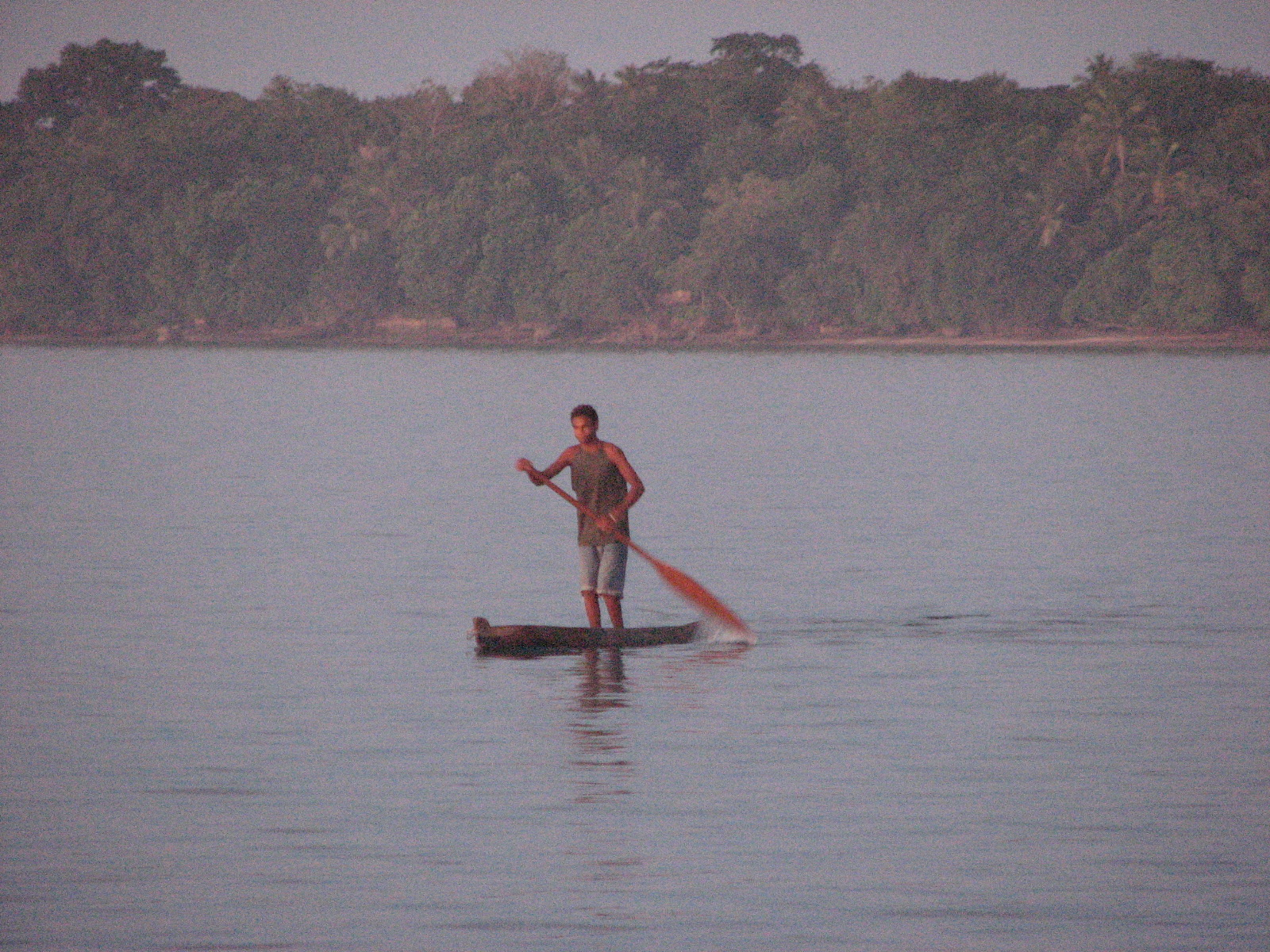
A canoeist off the west side of Fenualoa at sunset.

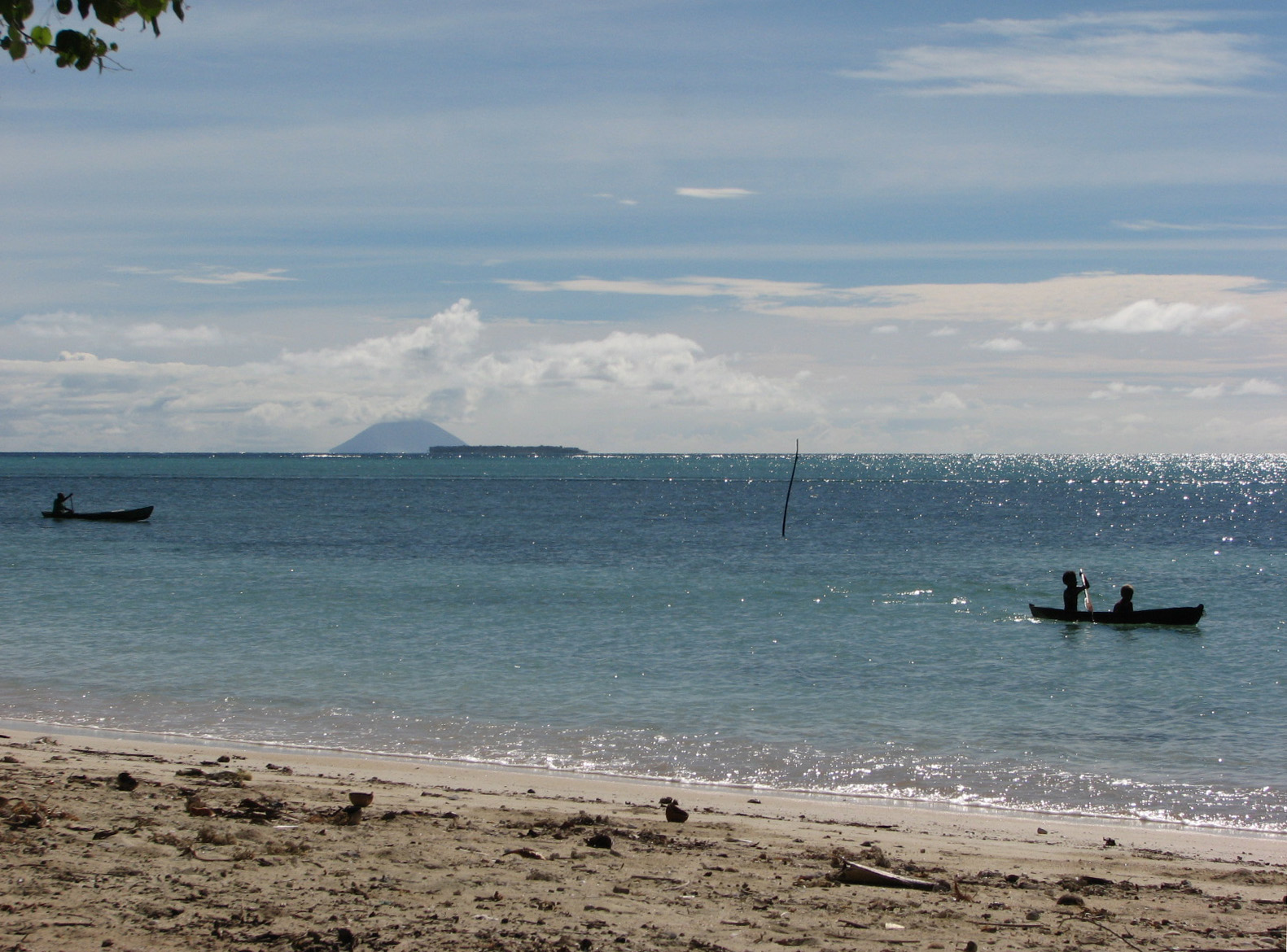
Looking west from the beach on Fenualoa across the Great Reef to the volcano of Tinakula.

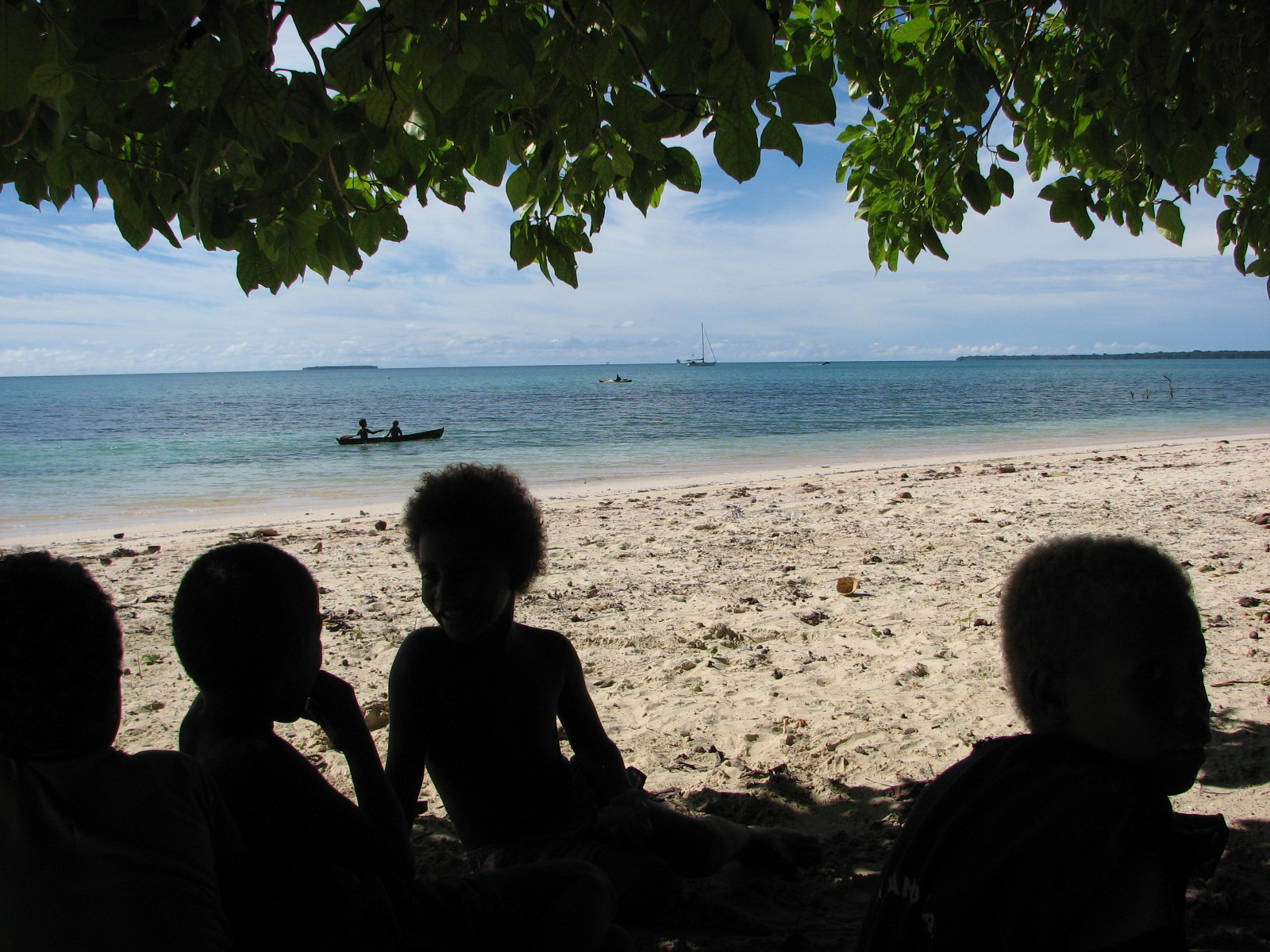
Children on the beach at Tuo village, Fenualoa with a visiting yacht in the background.

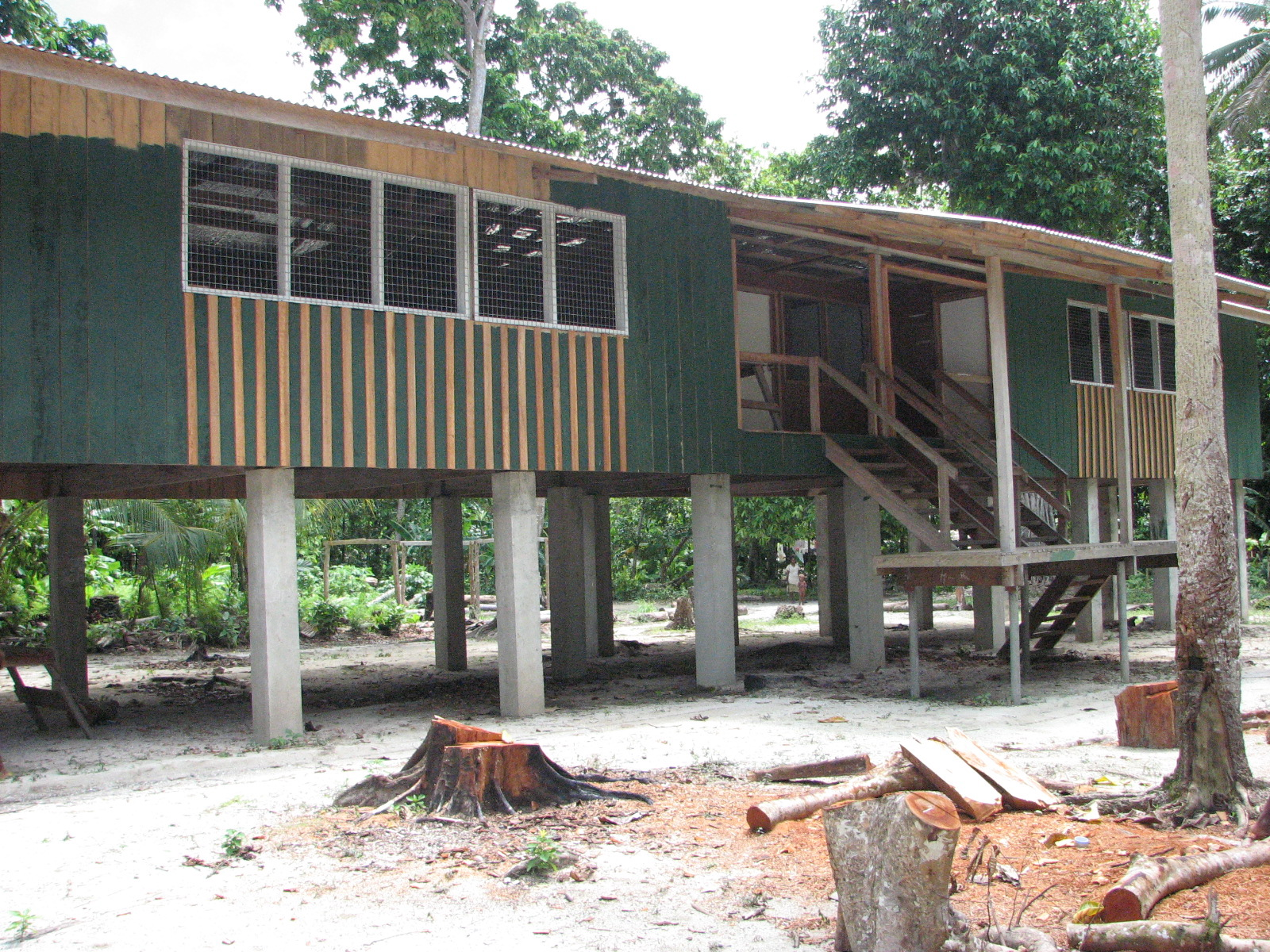
The school at Tuo village, Fenualoa completed in 2008 with New Zealand aid.

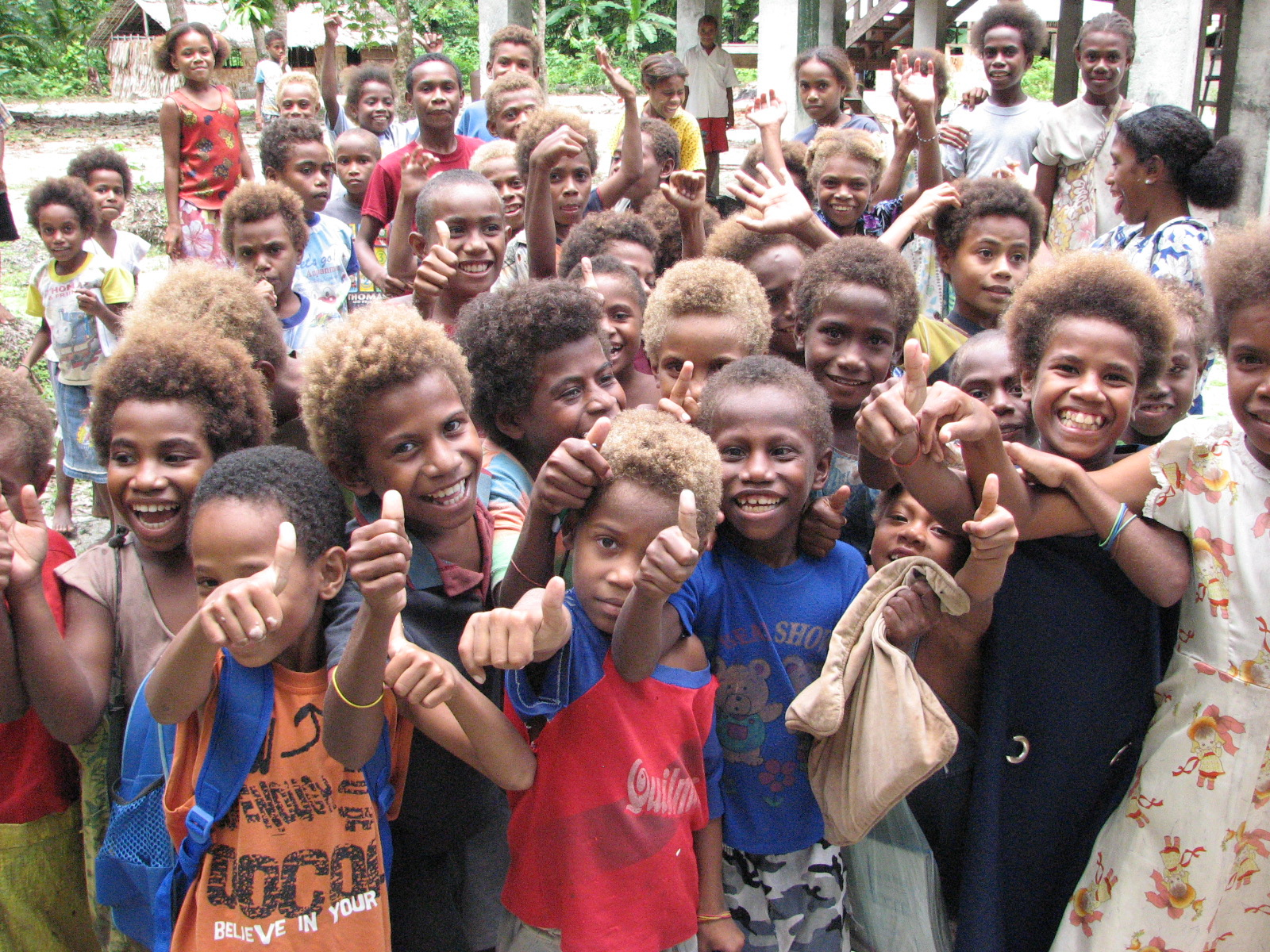
Children at Tuo school at Tuo village, Fenualoa.
