= Gallego (volcano) =

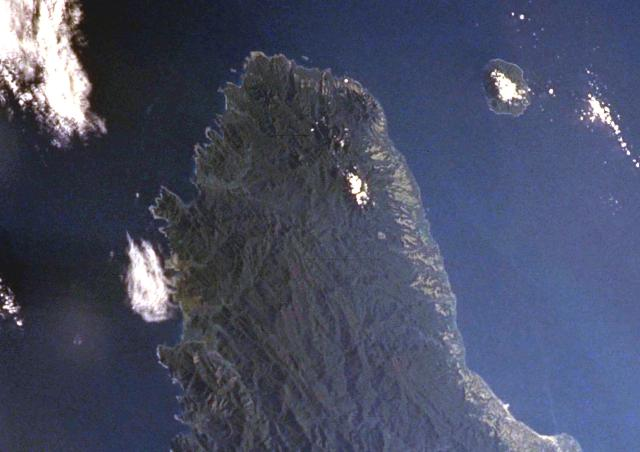
- The Pliocene-to-Quaternary Gallego volcanics cover a large area of NW Guadalcanal Island along the top part of this NASA Space Shuttle.

Highest point
- Elevation: 3,281 ft (1,000 m)
- Coordinates: 9.3469298°S 159.7118475°E

Dimensions
- Area: 800 km^{2} (310 mi^{2})

Geography
- Location: Guadalcanal
- Country: Solomon Islands

Geology
- Formed by: Subduction
- Rock age: 6.4 ±1.9 Ma
- Mountain type: Volcano Field
- Rock type: Andesite / Basaltic andesite
- Volcanic arc: Melanesian Arc
- Volcanic field: Gallego Volcanic Field
- Last eruption: Pleistocene

Gallego (ga‧lle‧go) also known as Mount Gallego is a volcano field located on the northwest side of the island Guadalcanal in the Solomon Islands. Volcanism here is the result of subduction, as the Indo-Australian Plate subducts under the Pacific Plate. Active during the Pleistocene, no historical eruptions have been documented.

== Geology ==
The oldest basement rocks date back to the Cretaceous and are made up of ocean flood basalts from previous Large igneous provinces (LIPs) which makes up the Guadalcanal terrane.

Initially subduction was north of Gallego. Between 25 and 20 Ma, the Ontong Java Plateau made it to the subduction zone. Due to the thick crust of the Ontong Java Plateau, subduction ceased. Moderen subduction began 5-8 Ma, where subduction underwent a subduction polarity reversal, creating the modern subduction orientation south of Gallego. Subduction continues today which created the southern Solomon Islands, including Guadalcanal and Gallego.

The central Gallego volcanic ridge has 4 distinct craters; Gallego, Popori (oldest), Talulu, and Komambulu. The caldera structure has been deeply eroded away, with only the volcanic interior visible today. Lava/pyroclastic laharic flows are seen extending from the central crater. It is thought that this volcanic complex was quite wide measuring (12 km/7.5 miles) across.

Lava composition varies greatly with layers of basalt, basaltic andesite, andesite, dacite, and rhyolite. These are moderate in calc-alkali. Mineralisation occurs as sulphide stockworks of porphyry-copper style, as sulphides in the andesites and volcanic porphyries and as hydrothermal epithermal mineralisation in altered, reworked andesitic pyroclastics (Gold Ridge, Guadalcanal).

== See also ==
- List of volcanoes in Solomon Islands
- Guadalcanal
