= Bass Islands (Duff Islands) =

Islands in Solomon Islands

Coordinates: 9.800°S 167.10°E

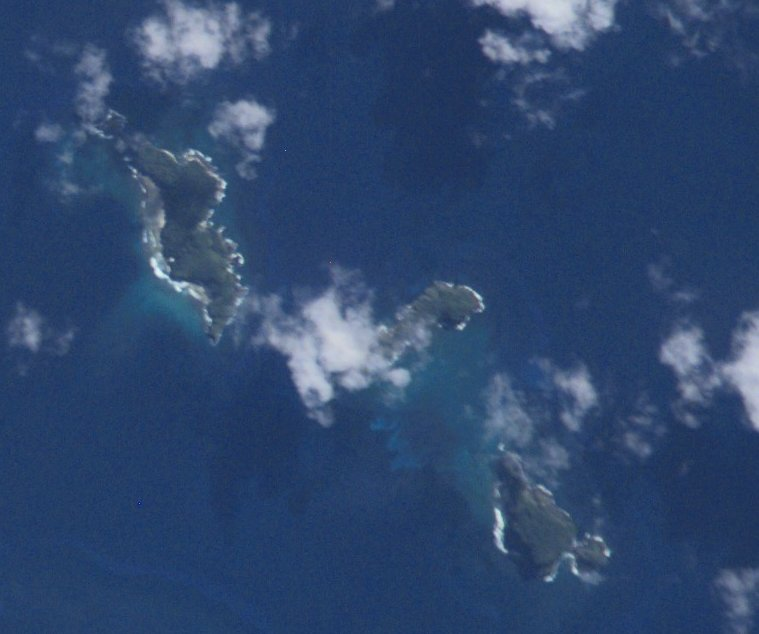

The Bass Islands are a subordinate group in the south of the Duff Islands of the nation of Solomon Islands in the Pacific Ocean. Alternatively they are known as Basses Islands or Ile de Bass. The estimated terrain elevation above sea level is some 15 metres.

== Geography ==
The group consists of three or four small rock islands (from north to south):

- Lua (with a very small, unnamed rock island to the north)
- Kaa
- Loreva Island

All islands are uninhabited.

== History ==
The Bass Islands were discovered on September 25, 1797. In the 1799 handwritten nautical chart of James Wilson, captain of the mission ship Duff of the London Missionary Society, the Bass Islands are for the first time verifiably mentioned, as Isle de Bass, with the note applicable to the entire Duff archipelago.
