= List of volcanoes in Solomon Islands =

This is a list of active and extinct volcanoes in Solomon Islands.

== Volcanoes ==
Name	Elevation		Location	Last eruption
Name	meters	feet	Coordinates	Last eruption
Coleman Seamount	-	-	8.83°S 157.17°E	10000 years ago
Gallego (volcano)	1000	3281	9.35°S 159.73°E	Pleistocene
Kana Keoki	-700	-2297	8.75°S 157.03°E	-
Kavachi	-20	-66	9.02°S 157.95°E	2014
Nonda	760	2493	7.67°S 156.60°E	Pleistocene
Savo Island	485	1591	9.13°S 159.82°E	1847
Simbo	335	1099	8.292°S 156.52°E	1910
Tinakula	851	2792	10.38°S 165.80°E	2017
