= Lomlom =

Island in Solomon Islands

Coordinates: 10°17′S 166°16′E

Lomlom is the largest of the Reef Islands in Temotu Province, in the nation of Solomon Islands. It measures seven by four kilometres and separated from Fenualoa by a deep channel. The estimated terrain elevation above sea level is some 21 metres. Variant forms of the island's name are Fonofono and Lom lom.

Lomlom is deserved by Lomlom Airport, the only airfield of Reef Islands.
