= Taumako =

Island in Temotu Province, Solomon Islands

Coordinates: 9°57′S 167°13′E

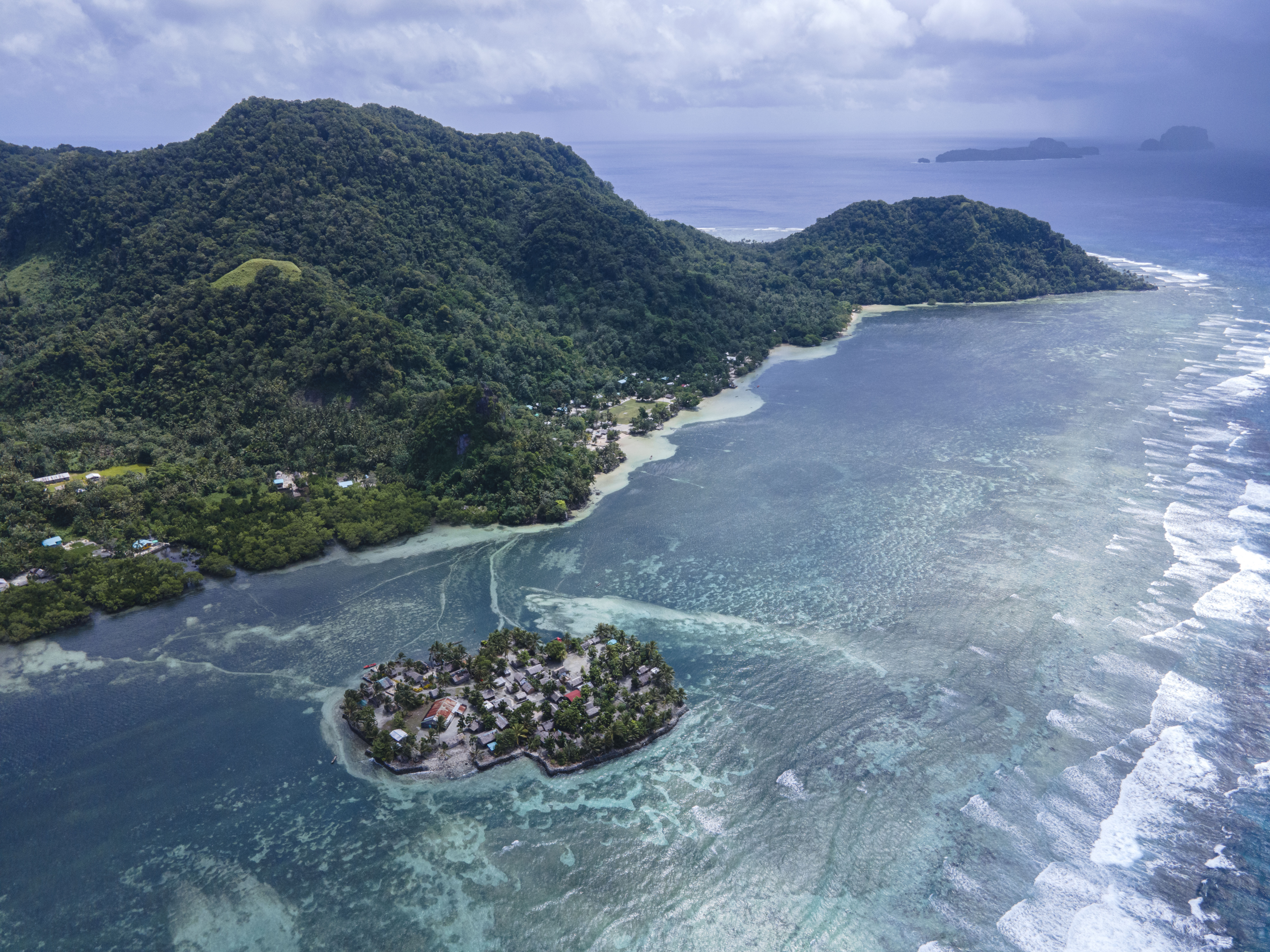
Taumako and Tahua

Taumako is the largest of the Duff Islands, in the nation of Solomon Islands in the Pacific Ocean. This 5.7-kilometre-long (3.5-mile) island has steep sides and rises to a height of 400 metres (1,312 feet) above sea level. It is composed of basaltic lavas and pyroclastics like the other islands in the Duffs.

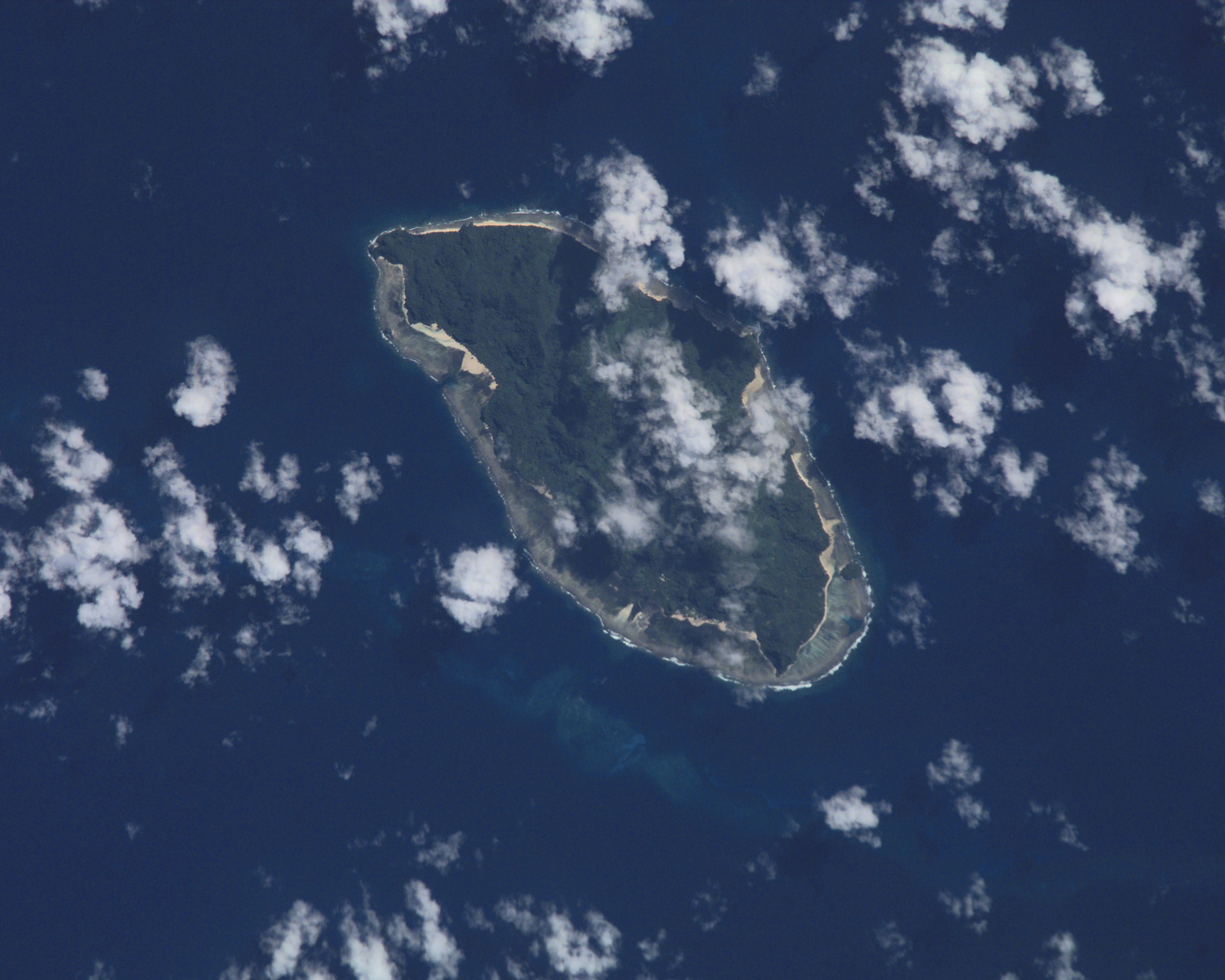
Taumako seen from space (courtesy NASA)

The Namu burial ground is of significant archaeological interest.

== Prehistory ==
People have been living in the Duff Islands for 3,000 years. The first people on these islands made pottery using clay and sand temper which was available locally. A small amount of this pottery was decorated in the distinctive Lapita style with dentate stamping. These first inhabitants made stone tools using high quality chert which was also local. This same chert has been found in archaeological sites in the nearby Reef Islands, dating at least two centuries before the first known evidence in the Duff Islands.

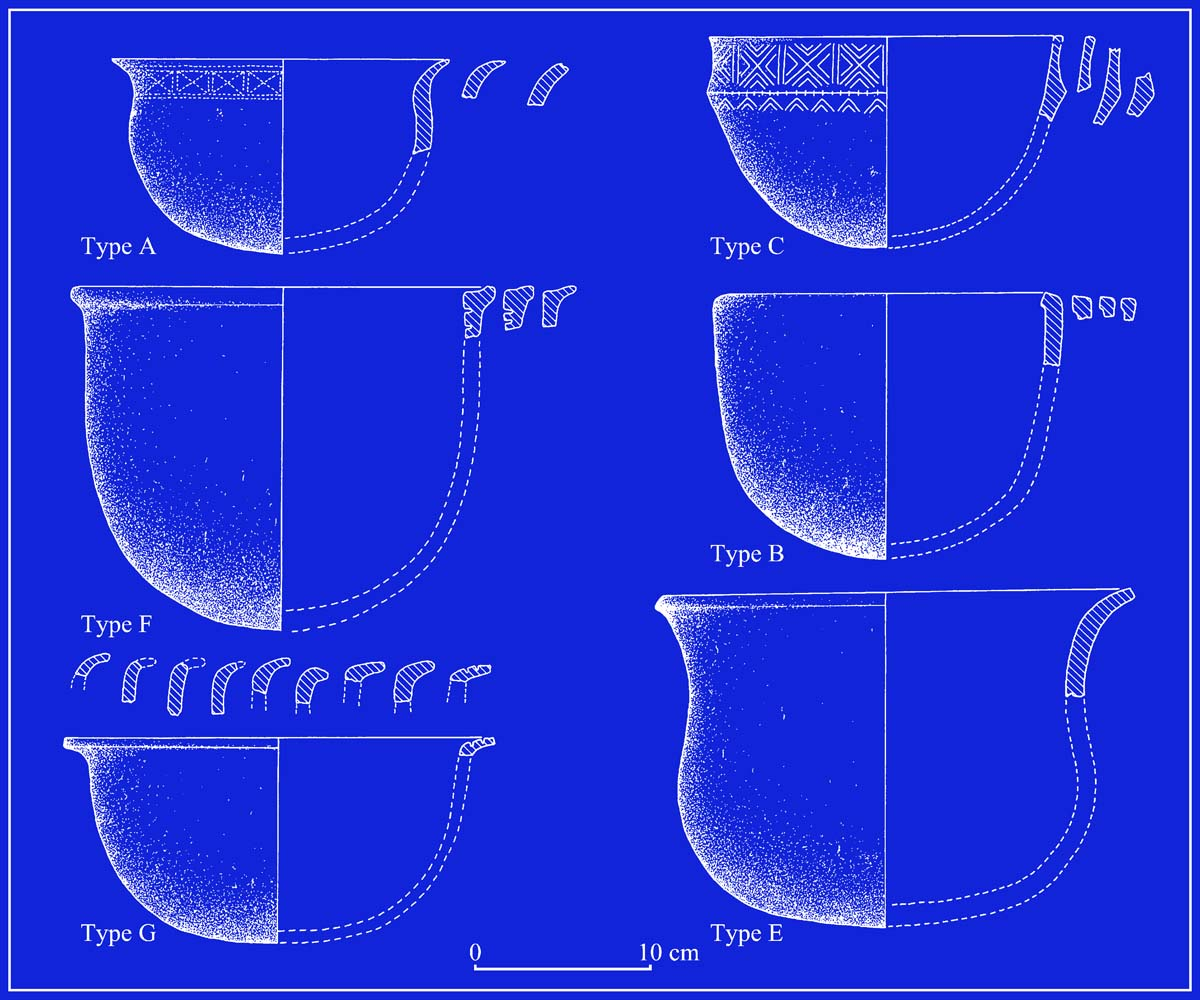
Prehistoric pottery vessels, including some with Lapita designs, from the island of Taumako

Later archaeological sites dating from AD 1,000 through to the 19th century contain a diverse range of personal ornaments, many of which are similar to those present in ethnographic collections from Santa Cruz displayed in numerous museums around the world. Several of these ornaments can now be shown to be present throughout the 3,000 years of their prehistory. Amongst these are the famous Tridacna shell breast pendants. Several specimens have imprints of fine loom woven cloth, representing the first unequivocal evidence for the presence of the loom in prehistoric Oceania. The backstrap loom has an unusual distribution in the Pacific region, including amongst the Atayal people of Taiwan, the islands of Yap in Micronesia, the Polynesian atholl of Kapingamarangi, and the Santa Cruz area in the Solomons.

Throughout the Duff Islands' prehistory there is clear archaeological evidence of contact with other Pacific Island peoples from as far afield as the Fiji-Samoa area. This is evident from stone adzes in these islands made from a form of basalt only found in the stone quarries of Tutuila in American Samoa. Most evidence of contact, however, is predictably from closer to Taumako, especially the nearby Santa Cruz region. These wide-ranging external contacts have resulted in a population of people which shows a profound mixture of Melanesian and Polynesian physical features.

Life in the Duff Islands during the prehistoric period was far from idyllic with a high incidence of the infectious disease yaws. This affected children as well as adults and in later life was often debilitating (ibid.: 229). There is also archaeological evidence of inter-personal hostility with deaths being caused by spear wounds. Some of this may have resulted from warfare between different groups, either locally or with arrivals from further afield.

== History ==
The first known European visit to the Duff Islands was the expedition led by the Spanish explorer Quiros in AD 1606. One of the late archaeological sites contained objects made from European materials. Amongst these, a piece of pottery has a mineralogy consistent with Spanish pottery of Quiros' period. In addition a small piece of brass has a chemical composition suggesting the same derivation.

== Traditional navigation ==
Studies of David Lewis and Marianne (Mimi) George identified that traditional Polynesian navigational techniques were still preserved in these islands. The people of Taumako built one of the oldest documented proa sailing canoes, called Te Puke and known to westerners as Tepukei or TePuke or other spellings. People from Outer Reef Islands and many other islands in SE Solomons also refer to this design as "Puki" and make no distinction between TePuke and Te Alo Lili or other Taumako designs.

In 1969, Tevake, a local navigator, accompanied David Henry Lewis on his ketch Isbjorn from Taumako using traditional navigation techniques by studying wave patterns and made landfall at Fenualoa, having navigated for 50 miles (80 km) without being able to view the stars, due to cloud cover.

Starting in 1996 the Vaka Taumako project of Pacific Traditions Society has been working to assist Taumako people to perpetuate the ancient Polynesian seafaring techniques of the people of Taumako. Since 2017 these efforts have been led by Vaka Valo Association of Taumako.

== People ==
The inhabitants of the Duff Islands are Polynesians, and their language, Vaeakau-Taumako, is a member of the Samoic branch of Polynesian languages.

The islands were settled at least as early as 900 BC, by people who made pottery known as Lapita. Archaeological research has shown that this pottery was made using local clay and sand from the island. These Lapita people spread far and wide from the coastal area of Papua New Guinea to the islands of Tonga and Samoa; that is, throughout islands known as both Melanesia and Polynesia. Consequently, the people of Taumako experienced wide-ranging influences, and could be said to have been both Melanesian and Polynesian throughout their long history.

In the 1999 census there were around 511 people living on the Duff Islands. The way of life is traditional by subsistence gardening and fishing.

== Access ==
Taumako has no roads, airport, telephones, or electricity. Contact with outsiders comes by battery-powered marine radio and the scheduled (but rarely happening) monthly inter-island ship from Honiara. However the radio is only for use by the clinic, and the battery is often flat.

== Places of interest ==
The Namu burial ground is of significant archaeological interest, with the human remains offering insights into the diet and other aspects of life on the island.
