= Ngawa Island =

Island in Solomon Islands

Coordinates: 10°15′S 166°10′E

Ngawa is one of the Reef Islands located in Temotu Province of the independent nation of Solomon Islands.

== Archaeology ==
In 1971 there were archaeological excavations of pottery sites on the island.
