= Duff Islands =

Islands in Solomon Islands

Coordinates: 9.800°S 167.10°E

The Duff Islands are a small island group lying to the northeast of the Santa Cruz Islands in province of Temotu Province, in the nation of Solomon Islands. They are also sometimes known as the Wilson Islands.

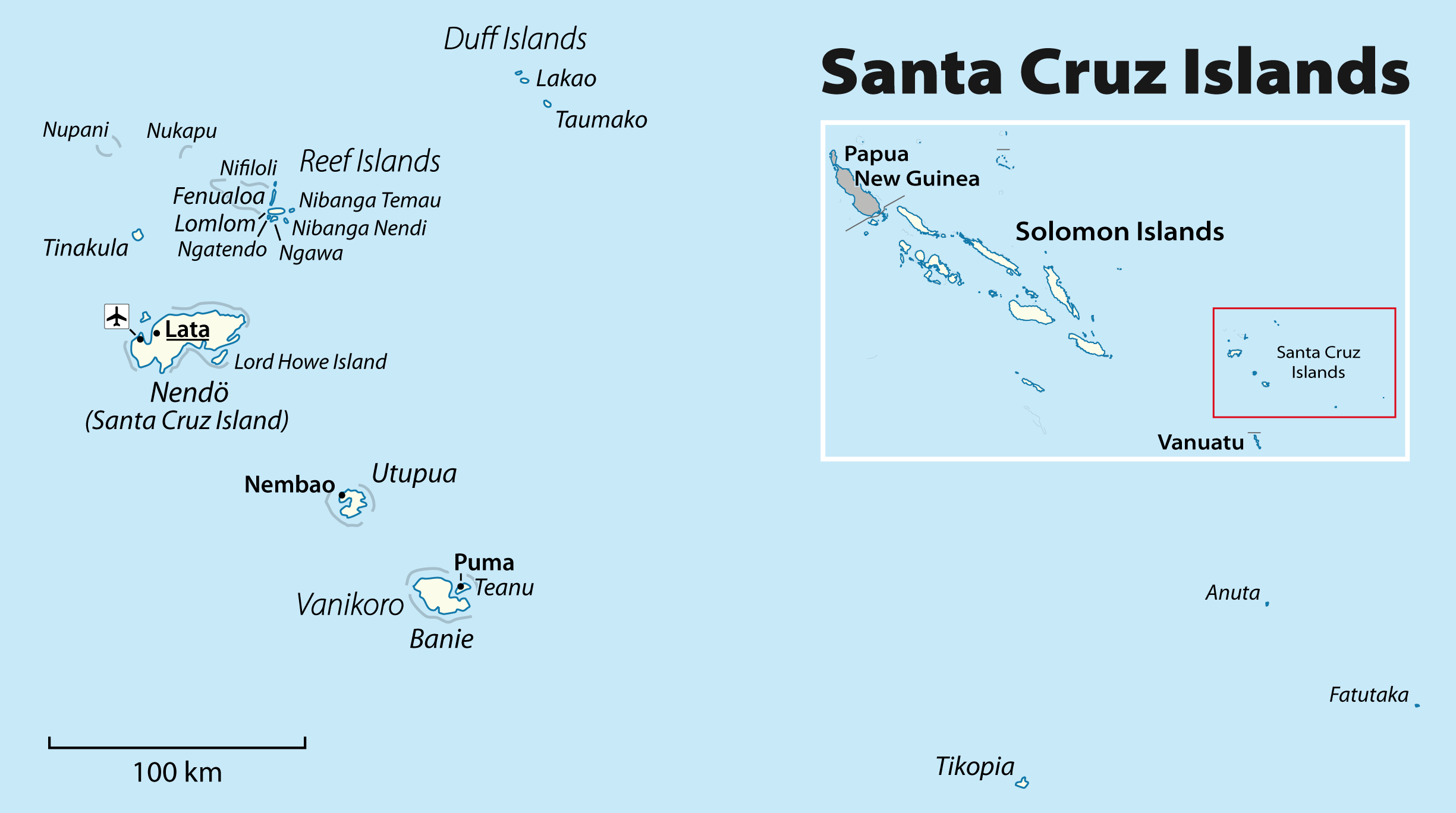

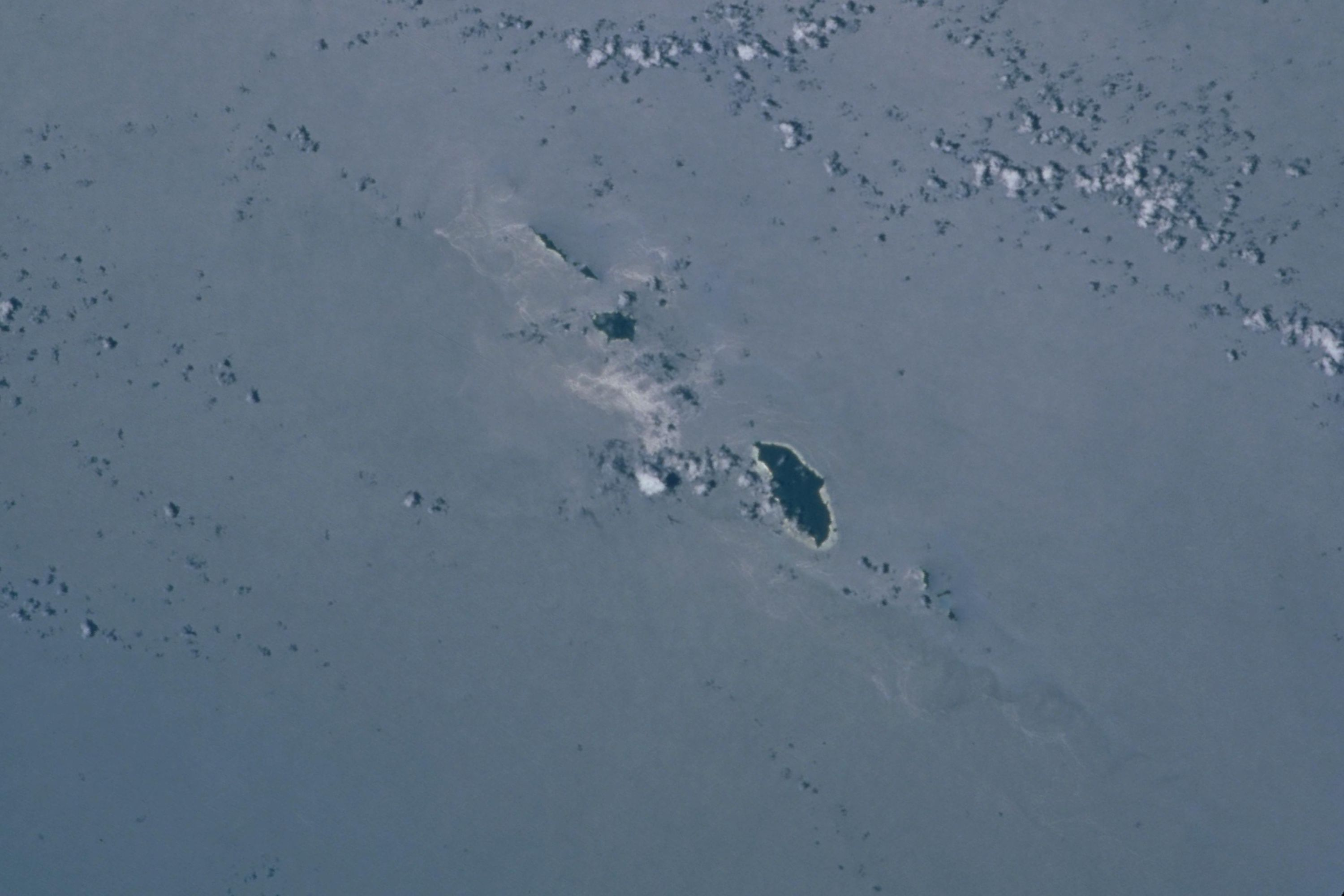
The Duff Islands seen from space.

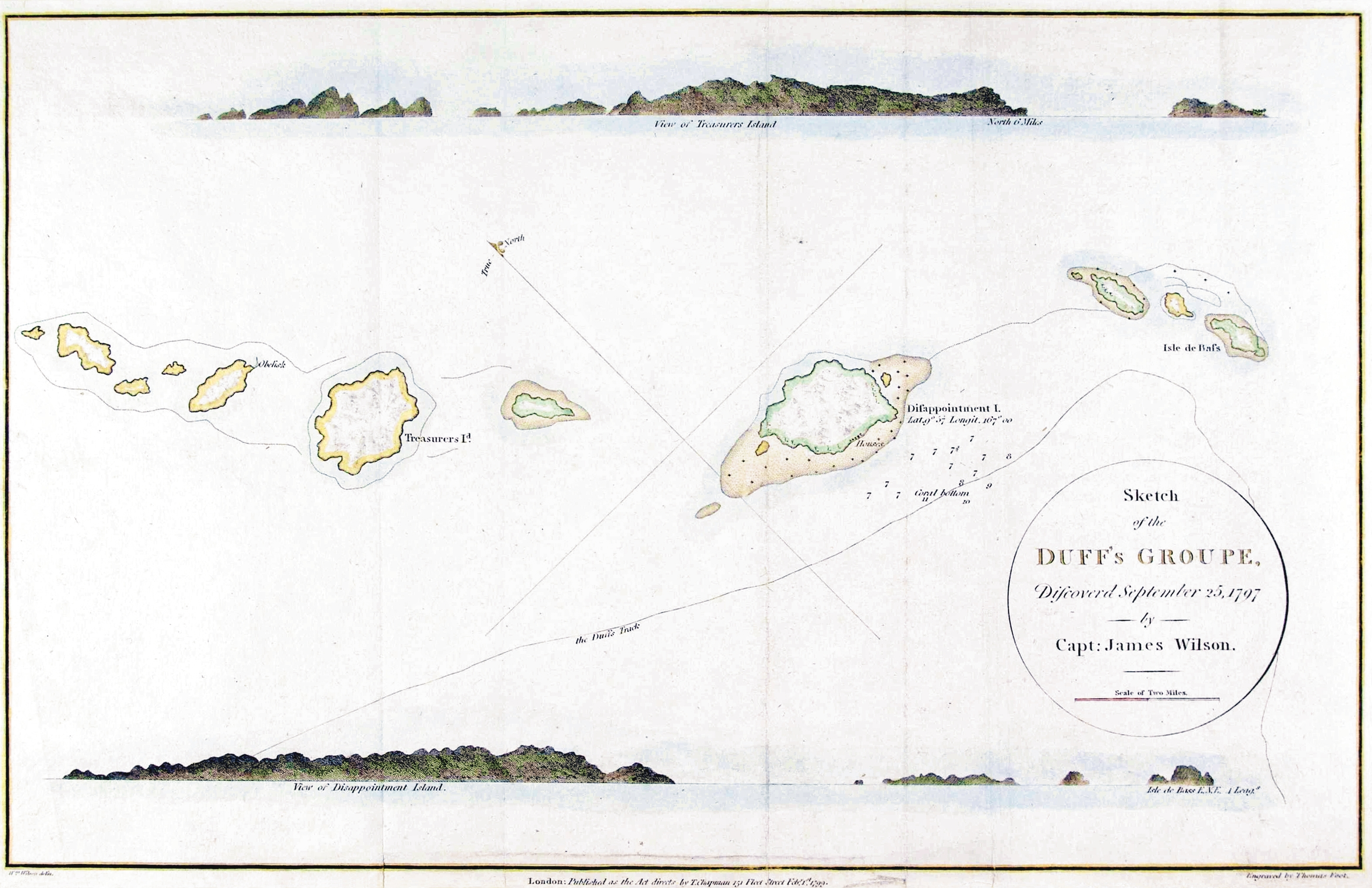
Map of 1799

== Location and geography ==
The islands are located at 9°51'48" S. lat., 167°4'48" E. long.

The Duff Islands consist of:

- Taumako, the main island, with nearby Tahua, Tohua, and Tatumotu
- The Bass Islands: Lua, Kaa and Loreva
- Treasurer's Islands: Tuleki (Nula), Elingi (Obelisk Island), Te Aku (Te Ako), Lakao and Ulaka

Frequently, Hallie Jackson Reef is mentioned in the context of the Duff islands, although it is located 45 km west of that 32 km long island chain, and although it is not an island, at most a submarine reef. In the Sailing Directions of 1969 Hallie Jackson Reef is described as a reef 24 feet deep, at 9°44'S, 166°07'E. The corresponding current (2017) publication no longer has any mention of the reef.

== Local population ==
The Duff Islands were settled by the Lapita people about 900 BC. They were followed by Melanesians and then Polynesians in the mid-1400s. The modern inhabitants of the Duff Islands are Polynesians, and their language, Vaeakau-Taumako, is a member of the Samoic branch of Polynesian languages. About 500 people live on the Duff Islands. The traditional way of life consists of subsistence farming and fishing. Taumako has no roads, airport, telephones, or electricity. Contact with outsiders comes by battery-powered marine radio and the occasional cargo ship.

== European Contact ==
The first recorded sighting by Europeans of the Duff Islands was by the Spanish expedition of Pedro Fernández de Quirós where it anchored on 8 April 1606. Its inhabitants named the islands as Taumako. They were charted by Quirós as Nuestra Señora del Socorro (Our Lady of Succour in Spanish).

The Duff Islands were named after missionary ship Duff, captained by James Wilson, which reached them in 1797.

== Traditional navigation ==
Studies of David Lewis and Marianne (Mimi) George identified that traditional Polynesian navigational techniques were still preserved in these islands.

== See also ==
- Melanesia
- Oceania
- Pacific Islands
- Pacific Ocean
- Polynesian outlier
- Three other Bass islands
