= Nifiloli =

Island in Solomon Islands

Coordinates: 10°11′11.5″S 166°17′59″E

Nifiloli is an island in the Reef Islands, in Temotu Province, in the independent nation of Solomon Islands. The estimated terrain elevation above sea level is 19 metres. Despite its location in Melanesia, the population of the islands is Polynesian.

The language spoken on Nifiloli is Vaeakau-Taumako.
