= Pileni =

Island in Solomon Islands

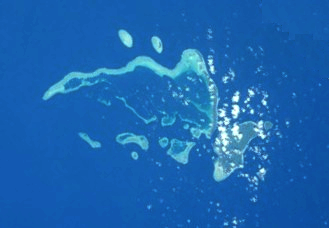
- NASA picture of the Reef Islands. Pileni is the island on the right off the northern coast

Geography
- Location: Pacific Ocean
- Archipelago: Solomon Islands
- Area: 0.23 km^{2} (0.089 sq mi)

Administration
- Solomon Islands

Demographics
- Population: 200 (2009)

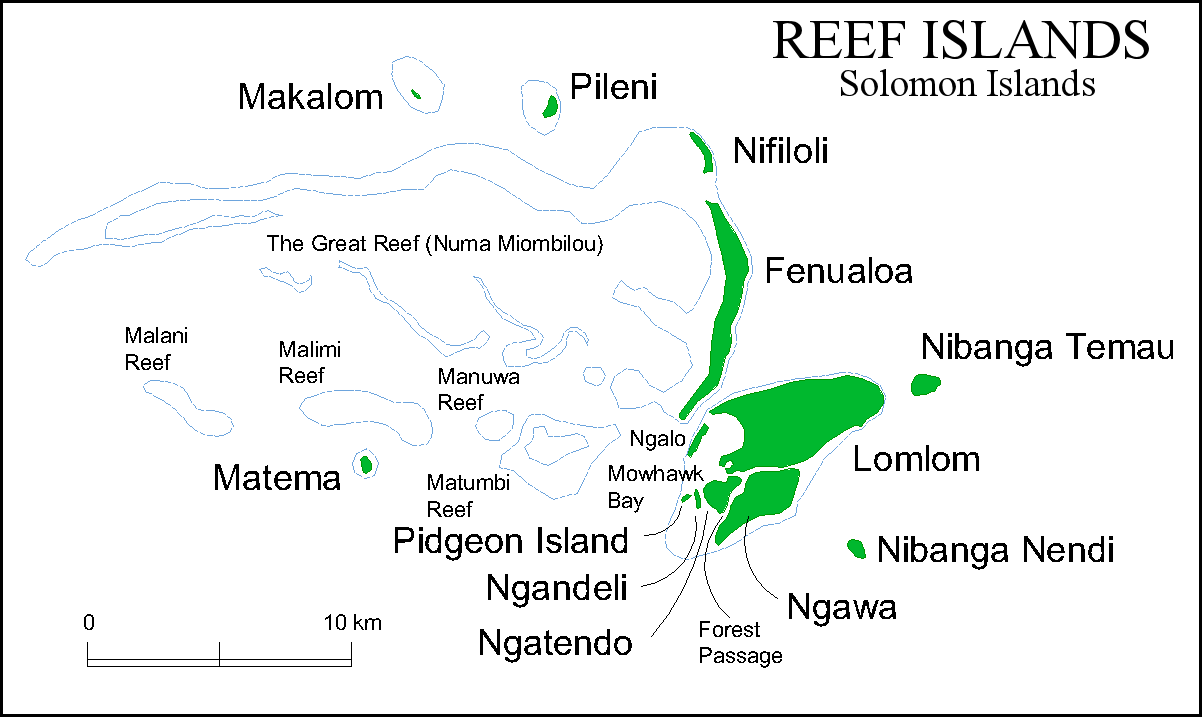
Map of the Reef Islands

Pileni is a culturally important island in the Reef Islands, Temotu Province, in the independent nation of Solomon Islands. Despite its location in Melanesia, the population of the islands is Polynesian.

Pileni has a population of below 300 inhabitants and is around 200 m (660 ft) wide and 500 m (1,600 ft) long. It is vulnerable to tsunamis and the sea level rising.

== History ==
The first church in Pileni was set up in the 1930s. The island was hit by cyclones in the 1950s, 1985 and 1993, and a tsunami struck the island in 1990. An extension school was set up on the island in 2002, the classroom of which is the island's only permanent building. From 2000, there has been a reported shortage of fish and shellfish, and some fruit trees have died.

== Economy ==
Per household, the average monthly income is between SI$51 and SI$200. Some households sell pigs to increase their income.

== Language ==
Pileni once gave its name to the Samoic-Outlier language spoken there. What used to be called Pileni is now more commonly referred to under its native name Vaeakau-Taumako.
