= Nalongo and Nupani =

Small atoll in Temotu Province in Solomon Islands

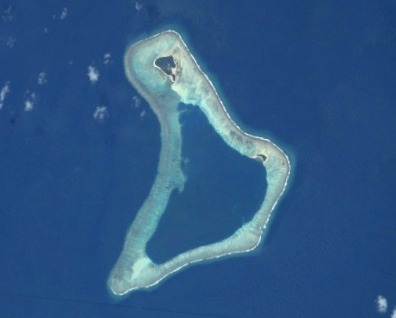
- NASA picture of Nalongo and Nupani Atoll

- Location within Solomon Islands

Geography
- Location: Pacific Ocean
- Coordinates: 10.0706°S 165.7269°E
- Archipelago: Solomon Islands
- Area: 0.7 km^{2} (0.27 sq mi)
- Highest elevation: 61 m (200 ft)

Administration
- Solomon Islands

Demographics
- Population: 100 (2009)

Nalongo and Nupani is a small atoll in Temotu Province, in the independent nation of Solomon Islands, in the southwestern Pacific Ocean. It has a coral reef totally encircling a 6 km wide lagoon. Nupani Island, also called Nimba, is inhabited with some 100 people, while Nalongo has no permanent habitation.
