= Temotu Province =

- Province
- Flag

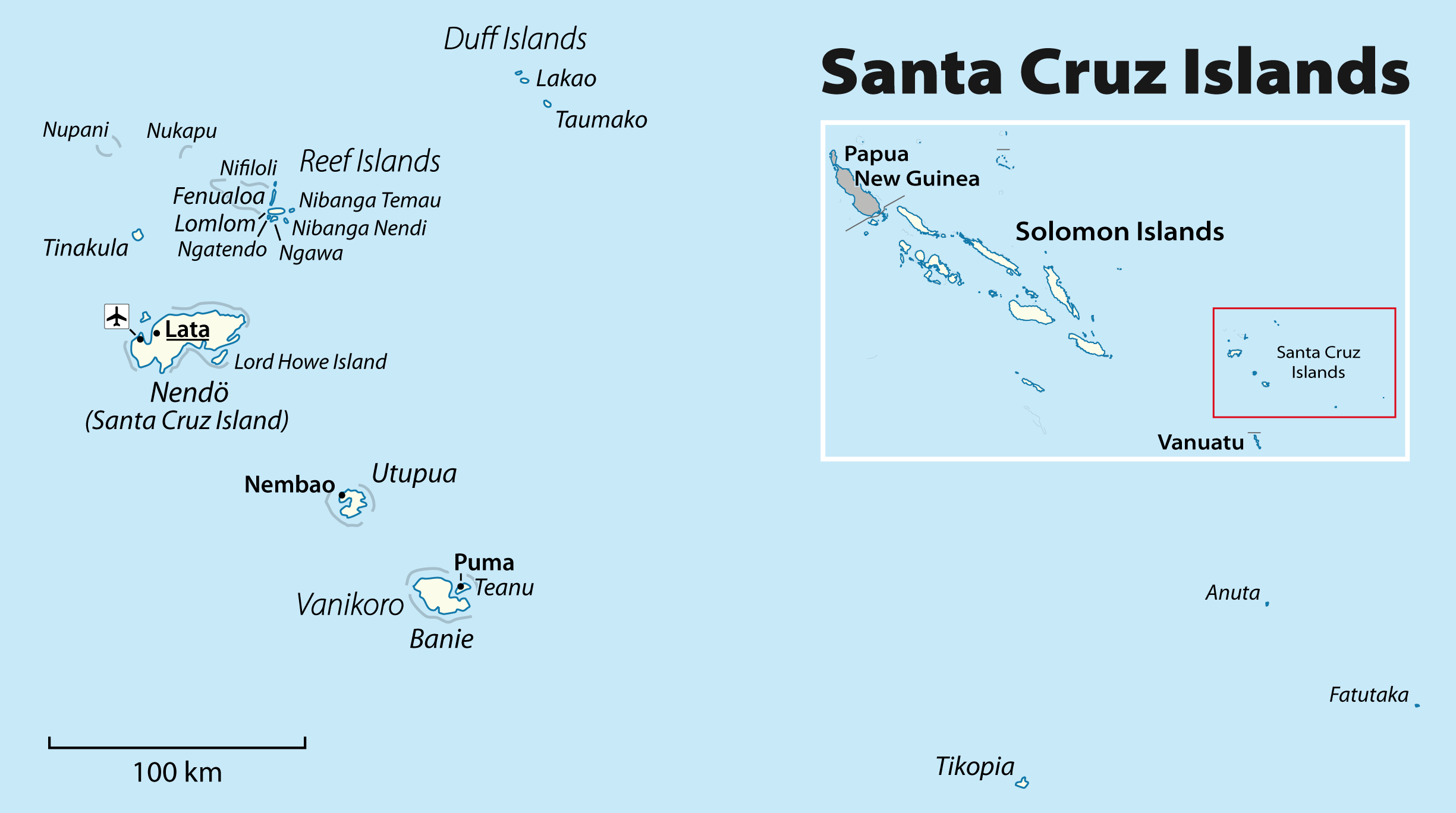
- Map of the Temotu province

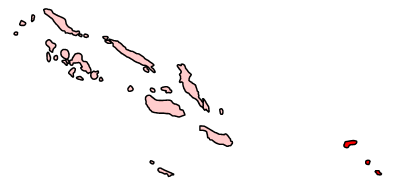
- Coordinates: 10°45′S 167°0′E
- Country: Solomon Islands
- Capital: Lata

Government
  - Premier: Hon. Stanley Tehiahua

Area
  - Total: 868 km^{2} (335 sq mi)

Population (2019 census)
  - Total: 22,319
  - Density: 25.7/km^{2} (66.6/sq mi)
- Time zone: UTC+11 (+11)
- ISO 3166 code: SB-TE

Temotu (or Te Motu, literally "the island" in several Polynesian languages) is the easternmost province of Solomon Islands. The province was formerly known as Santa Cruz Islands Province. Its area is 868 square kilometres (335 sq mi).

== Administrative divisions ==
Temotu Province is sub-divided into the following constituencies (or electoral districts), which are further sub-divided into wards (with populations at the 2009 and 2019 Censuses respectively):

Name		Population (2009 census)			Population (2019 census)		
Name		Total	Male	Female	Total	Male	Female
48. – Temotu Pele (Note: Also known as the Reef Islands)		5,527	2,621	2,906	5,395	2,637	2,758
48.01.	Fenualoa	1,305	618	687	1,262	621	641
48.02.	Polynesian Outer Islands (Note: Includes the islands of Nifiloli/Pileni/Matema/Nupani/Nukapu.)	353	165	188	283	134	149
48.03.	Nipua/Nopoli	880	422	458	912	456	456
48.04.	Lipe/Temua	793	367	426	747	346	401
48.05.	Manuopo	1,030	496	534	1,112	546	566
48.06.	Nenumpo	1,166	553	613	1,079	534	545
49. – Temotu Nende (Note: Also known as the Santa Cruz Islands)		11,578	5,768	5,810	12,345	6,201	6,144
49.07.	Nevenema	947	460	487	1,081	522	559
49.08.	Luva Station	2,335	1,143	1,192	1,953	1,018	935
49.09.	Graciosa Bay	1,264	638	626	1,451	741	710
49.10.	Nea/Noole	1,770	874	896	1,837	885	952
49.11.	North East Santa Cruz	1,843	936	907	2,178	1,121	1,057
49.12.	Nanggu/Lord Howe	1,861	955	906	2,144	1,071	1,073
49.17.	Neo	1,558	762	796	1,701	843	858
50. – Temotu Valu		4,257	2,077	2,180	4,579	2,217	2,362
50.13.	Duff Islands	511	262	249	493	237	256
50.14.	Utupua	1,168	586	582	1,356	666	690
50.15.	Vanikoro	1,293	625	668	1,670	826	844
50.16.	Tikopia	1,285	604	681	1,060	488	574
Total		21,362	10,466	10,896	22,319	11,055	11,264

== Islands ==
The islands or island groups which make up the province are:

- Anuta
- Duff Islands (including Taumako)
- Fatutaka
- Reef Islands (including Fenualoa, Lomlom, Makalom, Matema, Nalongo and Nupani, Nifiloli, Nukapu, Patteson Shoal, Pigeon Island and Pileni)
- Santa Cruz Islands (including the large island Nendö)
  - Malo
  - Tinakula
  - Utupua
  - Vanikoro (including Banie and Teanu)
- Tikopia

The provincial capital is Lata, located on Nendö, the largest and most important of the Santa Cruz islands.

== Population ==
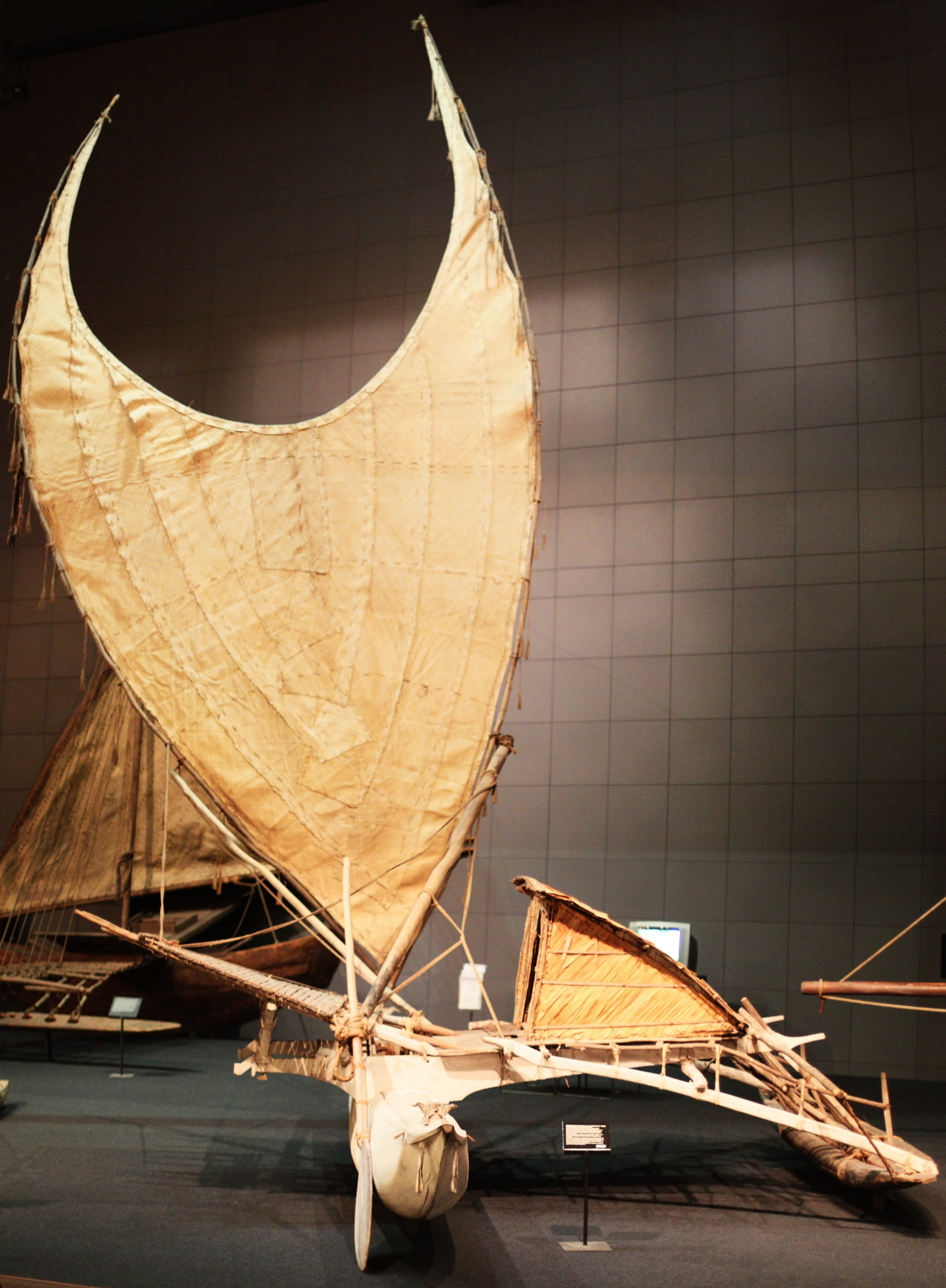
Tepukei (ocean-going outrigger canoe) from the Santa Cruz Islands, held in the Ethnological Museum of Berlin.

The population of the province was 22,319 as of 2019. The province is quite diverse for its small land area. The Santa Cruz Islanders are predominantly Melanesian, although the inhabitants of Tikopia, Anuta, the Duff Islands and some of the Reef Islands are Polynesians.

== Languages ==
The province has given its name to the Temotu languages, a putative linguistic subgroup within the broader Oceanic family of languages.

The languages spoken in the province include all of the Temotu languages proper, plus two Polynesian outlier languages: Vaeakau-Taumako and Tikopia.

== See also ==
- Remote Oceania
- Koch, Gerd (1971). Die Materielle Kultur der Santa Cruz-Inseln (in German). Berlin: (Museum fur Volkerkunde) Ethnological Museum of Berlin.
