= Puma =

Puma or PUMA may refer to:

== Animals ==
- Puma (genus), in the family Felidae
  - Puma (species) or cougar, a large cat

== Businesses and organisations ==
- Puma (brand), a multinational shoe and sportswear company
- Puma Energy, a mid- and downstream oil company
- People United Means Action, originally named "Party Unity My Ass", a political action committee during the 2008 U.S. presidential election

== Languages ==
- Puma language, a language of Nepal
- Teanu language or Puma, a language of the Solomon Islands

== People ==
- Carlos Landín Martínez, a.k.a. El Puma, Mexican drug lord
- José Luis Rodríguez (singer) (born 1943), a.k.a. El Puma, Venezuelan singer and actor
- Puma King (born 1990), a.k.a. Puma, Mexican wrestler
- Puma Swede (born 1976), Swedish pornographic actress
- Ricochet (wrestler) (born 1988), a.k.a. Puma, American wrestler
- T. J. Perkins (born 1984), a.k.a. Puma, American wrestler
- Puma Jones (1953–1990), member of the musical group Black Uhuru
- Puma Shen (born 1982), a.k.a. Puma, a Taiwanese criminologist, lawyer, and politician

== Places ==
- Puma (village), Solomon Islands
- Puma (Tanzanian ward)

== Sports ==
- Pumas (Currie Cup), a South African rugby union team representing Mpumalanga province
- Los Pumas, the Argentina national rugby union team
- Pumas UNAH, a defunct Honduran football club
- Pumas UNAM, a Mexican league football club, representing the National Autonomous University of Mexico (UNAM)
  - Pumas UNAM (women), the organization's women division
  - Pumas UNAM (youth), the organization's youth academy
  - Pumas Morelos, the organization's former subdivision in the state of Morelos
  - Pumas Tabasco, the organization's former subdivision in the state of Tabasco
  - Pumas CU football, the college football team

== Science and technology ==
- Puma (microarchitecture), a computer microarchitecture by AMD
- Puma (web server), an HTTP web server
- Puma (Hewlett-Packard), a codename for the HP 1000CX palmtop PC
- Mac OS X 10.1, an operating system by Apple Inc. (codename "Puma")
- Programmable Universal Machine for Assembly, an industrial robot arm
- Protected User Mode Audio (PUMA), a subset of Protected Media Path, a DRM technology
- p53 upregulated modulator of apoptosis (PUMA), a pro-apoptotic protein
- Paediatric-use marketing authorisation (PUMA), by the European Medicines Agency
- PUMA experiment, an experiment at the antiproton decelerator, CERN

== Transportation ==
=== Aircraft ===
- Aero-Service Puma, a Polish ultralight aircraft
- Aérospatiale SA 330 Puma, a helicopter
- BDC Aero Puma, a Canadian ultralight aircraft
- AeroVironment RQ-20 Puma, an American unmanned surveillance aircraft

=== Automobiles ===
- Puma (car manufacturer), a Brazilian, then South African, brand of sports cars
- Puma (kit car company), an Italian brand of dune buggy and sports kit-car
- Ford Puma (crossover), an American-German subcompact SUV
- Ford Puma (coupé), an American-German compact sports coupe
- Personal Urban Mobility and Accessibility (PUMA), an experimental vehicle by Segway and General Motors

=== Combat vehicles ===
- Puma (Italian armoured fighting vehicle), an Italian family of armoured fighting vehicles
- Puma (German infantry fighting vehicle), a German infantry fighting vehicle
- Puma armored engineering vehicle, an Israeli combat engineering vehicle
- PUMA M26-15, a South African armoured personnel carrier

== Other uses ==
- Puma (band), a Norwegian experimental jazz ensemble
- Puma (character), Marvel Comics character
- Public Use Microdata Area (PUMA), geographic units used by the U.S. Census
- "Puma", a song by TXT from their 2020 EP The Dream Chapter: Eternity

== See also ==
- Puma Yumco, a lake in Tibet
- Pumapunku, an archeological site in Tiwanaku, Bolivia
- Sabel v Puma, a CJEU case
