= Santa Cruz Islands =

Island group in Solomon Islands

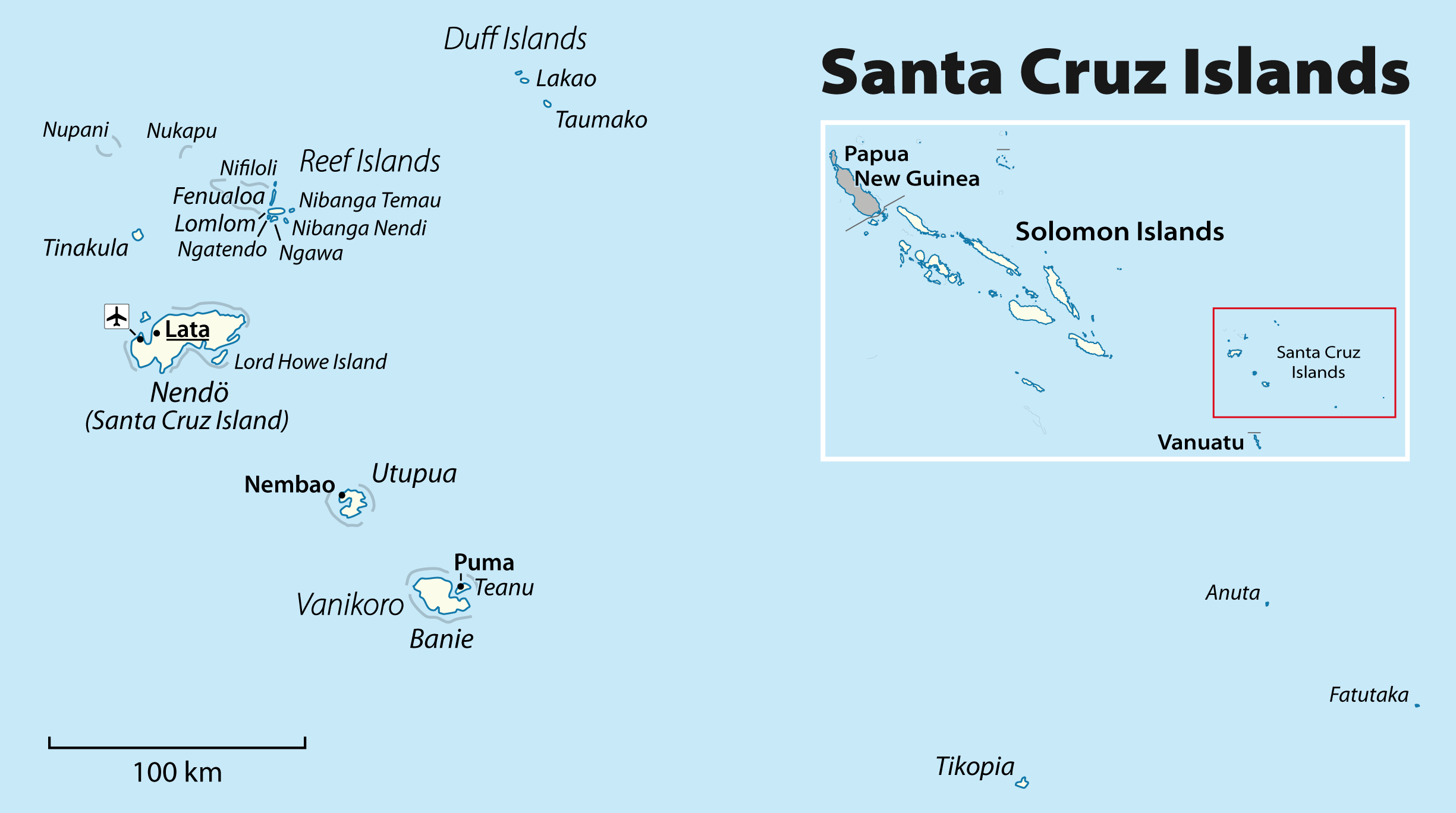
Map of the Santa Cruz Islands

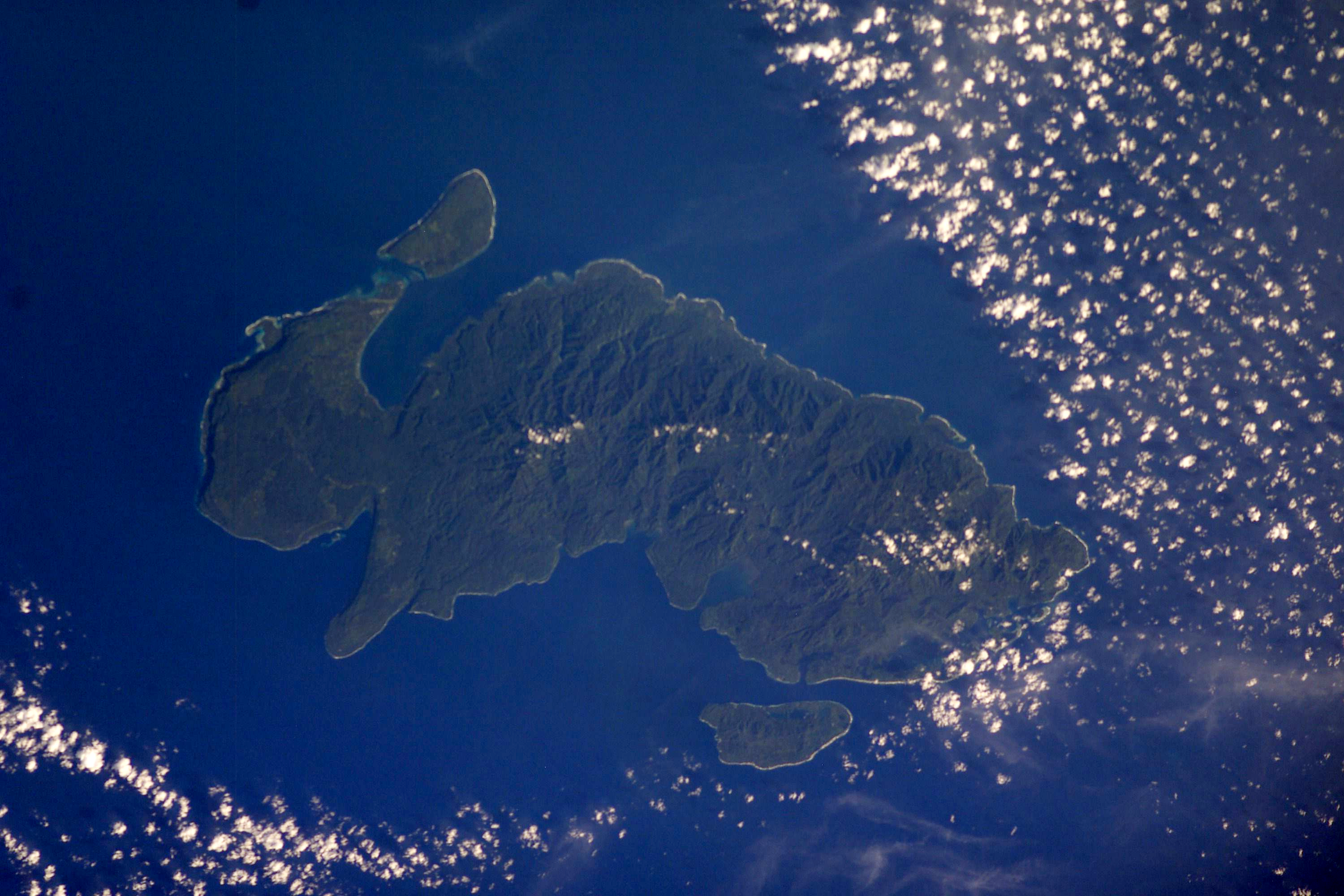
A NASA picture of Nendö, the largest of the Santa Cruz Islands

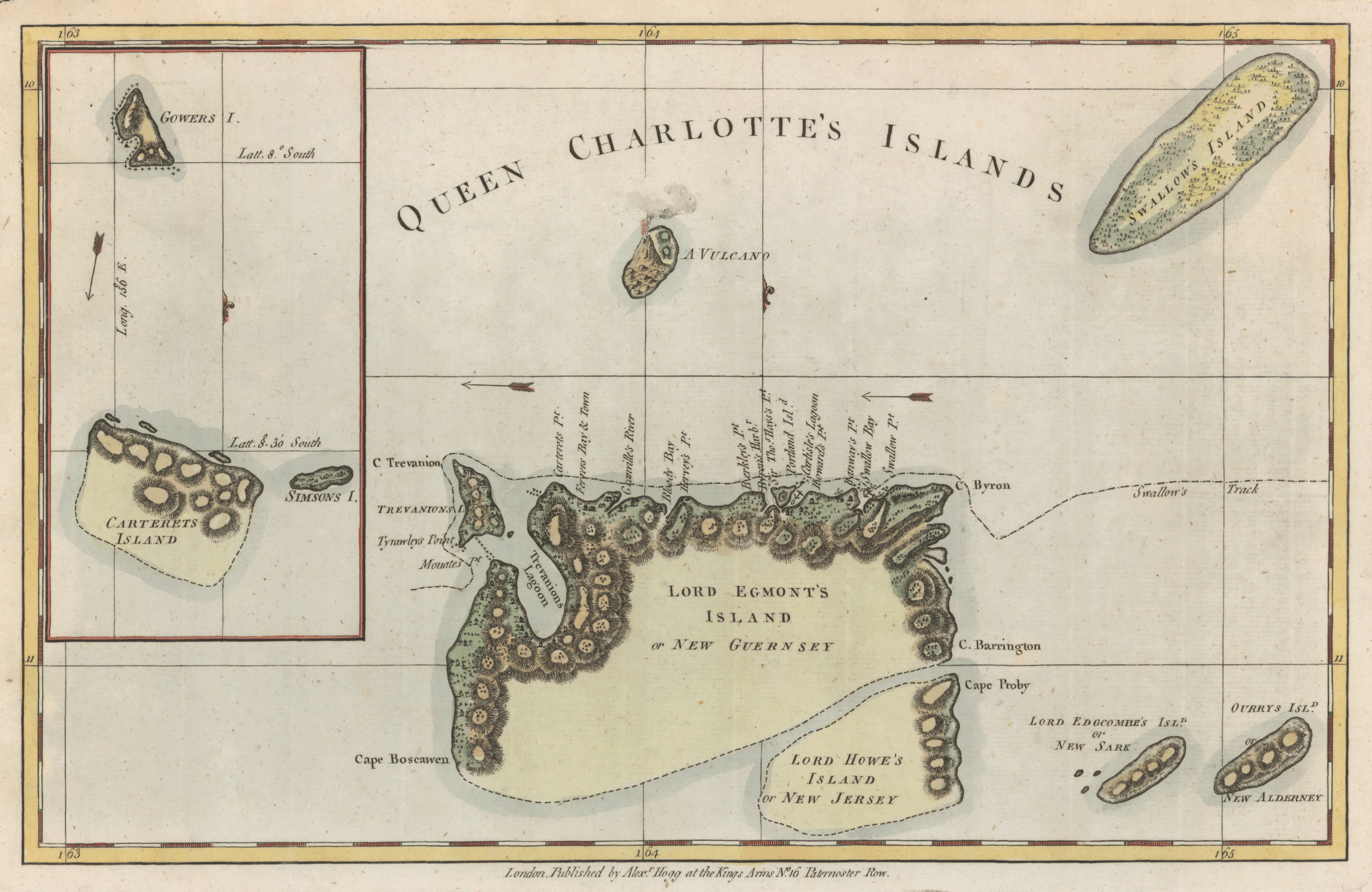
Map of "Queen Charlotte's Islands," based on exploration by Philip Carteret in 1767

The Santa Cruz Islands form an archipelago in Temotu Province, Solomon Islands. They lie approximately 250 miles (220 nmi; 400 km) to the southeast of the Solomon Islands archipelago, just north of the archipelago of Vanuatu and are considered part of the Vanuatu rain forests ecoregion. The term Santa Cruz Islands is sometimes used to encompass all the islands of Temotu Province, Solomon Islands.

== Geography ==
The largest island is Nendö, which is also known as Santa Cruz Island proper. Lata, located on Nendö, is the largest town, and is the capital of Temotu Province.

Other islands belonging to the Santa Cruz group are Vanikoro (which is actually made up of two islands, Banie and its small neighbour Teanu) and Utupua. The table below provides basic data on these three islands.

Island name	Area		Population	Capital	Elevation		Coordinates
Island name	(km²)	(sq. mi)	Population	Capital	(metres)	(feet)	Coordinates
Nendö	505.5	195.2	5,000	Lata	549	1,801	10°25′S 165°30′E
Vanikoro (=Banie + Teanu)	173.2	66.9	1,293	Puma	924	3,031	11°39′S 166°54′E
Utupua	69.0	26.6	848		380	1,247	11°20′S 166°30′E
Santa Cruz Islands	747.7	288.7	7,141	Lata	924	3,031	11°00′S 166°15′E

The Santa Cruz Islands are less than five million years old and were pushed upward by the tectonic subduction of the northward-moving Indo-Australian Plate under the Pacific Plate. The islands are mostly composed of limestone and volcanic ash over limestone.

== Culture ==
=== Languages ===
The native languages of the islands are classified as the Reef Islands – Santa Cruz languages, within the Oceanic subgroup of the Austronesian language family.

=== Ocean Navigation ===
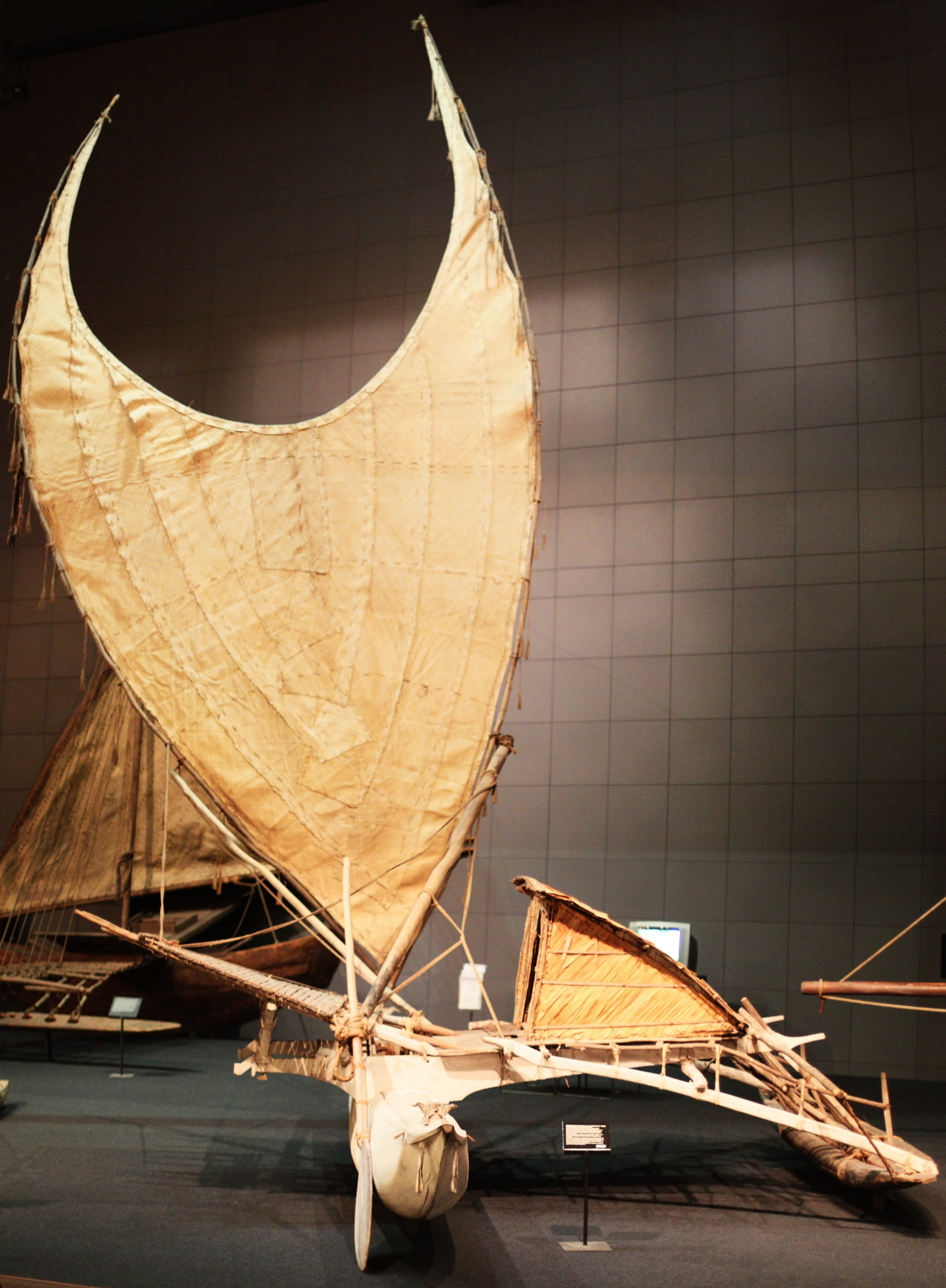
Tepukei, an ocean-going outrigger canoe from the Santa Cruz Islands

Historically, the people of Santa Cruz made long-distance ocean-going voyages using Tepukei. Tepukei are ocean-going outrigger canoes specific to some Polynesian societies of eastern Solomon Islands including Santa Cruz. In 1966 Gerd Koch, a German anthropologist, carried out research at Graciosa Bay on Nendö Island (Ndende/Ndeni) in the Santa Cruz Islands and on Pileni and Fenualoa in the Reef Islands, and returned with documentary film, photographic and audio material. The films that Koch completed are now held by the German National Library of Science and Technology (TIB) in Hanover. He brought back to the Ethnological Museum of Berlin the last still complete Tepukei from the Santa Cruz Islands. In 1971 Koch published Die Materielle Kultur der Santa Cruz-Inseln (The Material Culture of the Santa Cruz Islands).

Navigators from the Santa Cruz islands retained traditional navigation techniques into the 20th century; these techniques were also known by the navigators of the Caroline Islands. In 1969, Tevake accompanied David Henry Lewis on his ketch Isbjorn from Taumako using traditional navigation techniques by studying wave patterns and made landfall at Fenualoa, having navigated for 50 miles (43 nmi; 80 km) without being able to view the stars, due to cloud cover. On a second voyage from Nifiloli to Vanikoro, Tevake navigated by the stars, wave patterns, and the patterns of bioluminescence that indicated the direction in which islands were located.

== Contact with other cultures ==
The islands were visited by Spanish explorer Álvaro de Mendaña, the first European to sight them, on his second Pacific expedition in 1595. Mendaña started a colony on Nendö which he named Santa Cruz, at the place also named by the Spaniards as Graciosa Bay, and he died there in 1596.

== World War II ==
During the Pacific campaign of World War II, the Battle of the Santa Cruz Islands was fought north of the Santa Cruz group and some United States Navy seaplanes were based in Graciosa Bay, with one reportedly sinking at the seaplane base there. U.S. Navy Patrol Squadron 23 (VP-23), known as the "Seahawks," was stationed at Graciosa Bay, from which it operated Consolidated PBY Catalina flying boats, including on "Black Cat" night missions. Chemical ordnance stored on Vanikoro Island during World War II was not completely removed until the 1990s.

== 2013 Solomon Islands earthquake ==
The Santa Cruz Islands were affected by the 2013 Solomon Islands earthquake and subsequent tsunami on 6 February 2013. The earthquake produced a tsunami measuring 1 metre (3 ft 3 in) at Lata, Solomon Islands, that reached about 500 m (1,640 ft) inland. The airport and low-lying areas were flooded, killing nine people, five of them elderly and one a child. More than 100 houses on the island were damaged, and the water and electricity services were interrupted. It was reported that almost all houses in Nela village were washed away, and some homes in Venga village were shifted by water.

== See also ==
- American Caesar: Douglas MacArthur, 1880-1964, by William Manchester, p. 320
- Melanesia
- Oceania
- Pacific Islands
