= VNK (disambiguation) =

VNK may refer to:

- VnK Railway, a railway line in Berlin
- vnk, the ISO 639-3 code for Lovono language
- Valtioneuvoston kanslia, the foremost governing body of the Finnish Government
- Toyota Motor Manufacturing France, the world manufacturer identifier VNK
