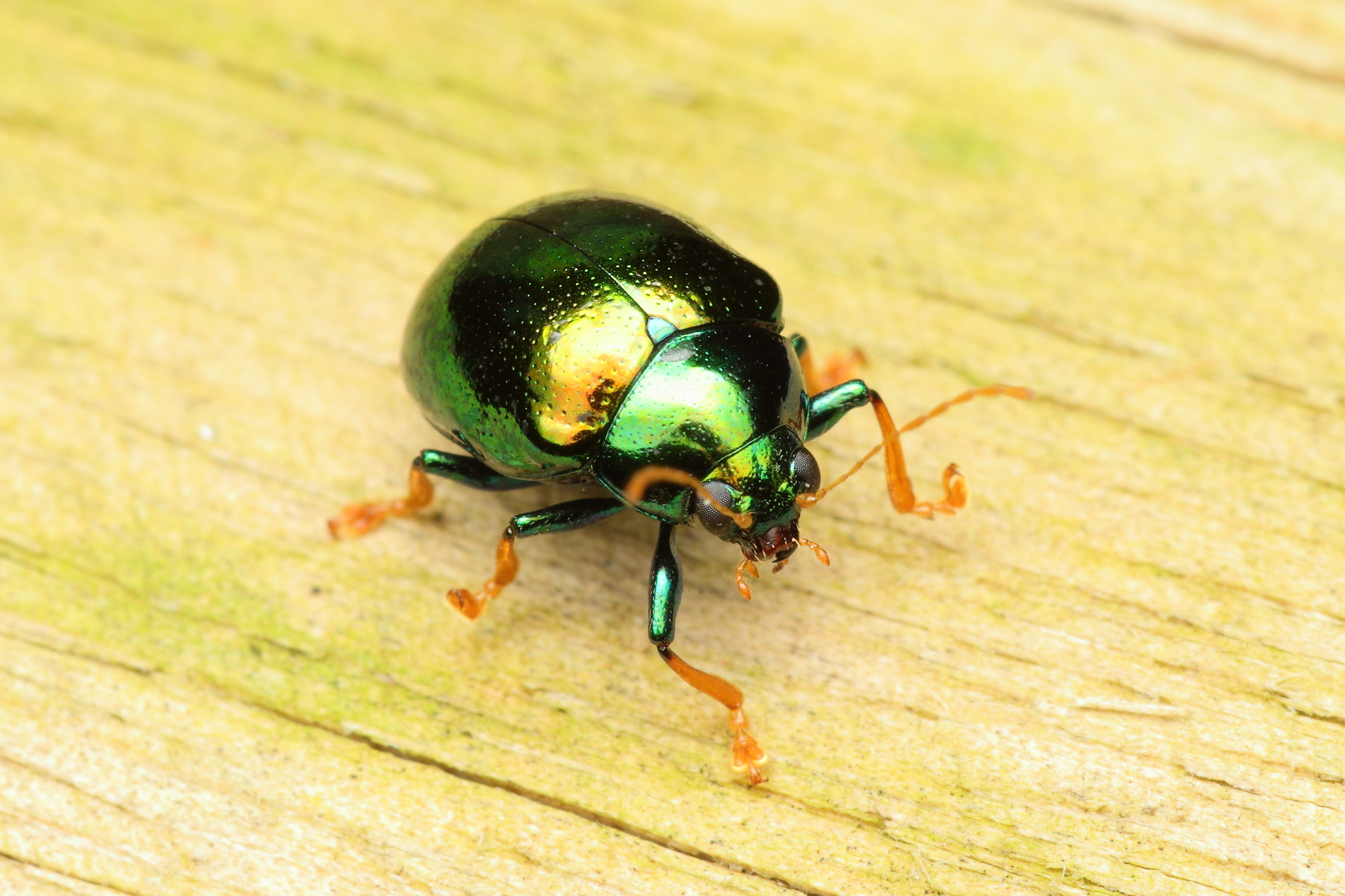
- Colaspoides fulgida, Brazil

Scientific classification
- Kingdom: Animalia
- Phylum: Arthropoda
- Clade: Pancrustacea
- Class: Insecta
- Order: Coleoptera
- Suborder: Polyphaga
- Infraorder: Cucujiformia
- Family: Chrysomelidae
- Subfamily: Eumolpinae
- Tribe: Eumolpini
- Genus: Colaspoides; Laporte, 1833

Type species
- Cryptocephalus limbatus Fabricius, 1781

Species
- See text

Synonyms
- Amasia Dejean, 1836 (nomen nudum); Melina Chevrolat in Dejean, 1836 (nomen nudum); Colaspidoides Agassiz, 1846; Amasia Chapuis, 1874; Melina Chapuis, 1874 (preoccupied name); Melinophora Lefèvre, 1885; Tailandia Chûjô, 1964

= Colaspoides =

Colaspoides Temporal range: Eocene–recent, 37.2–0 Ma

Genus of leaf beetles

Colaspoides is a genus of leaf beetles in the subfamily Eumolpinae. It is one of the largest genera in the subfamily, containing over 260 species worldwide. It is an extant genus but there is at least one species, C. eocenicus, found in Baltic amber from the Upper Eocene of Russia, and the genus has also been reported from the Miocene of the Dominican Republic.

The Neotropical species of Colaspoides, including the type species, lack elytra-locking grooves on the pygidium, unlike in the Asian species and in similar-looking Neotropical Eumolpinae genera such as Beltia. According to Flowers (2018), this suggests that the Asian species of Colaspoides should be transferred to different genera.

== Species ==
The genus contains the following species:

Neotropical species:

- Colaspoides abdominalis Jacoby, 1900 – Bolivia
- Colaspoides alcyonea (Erichson, 1847) – Peru
- Colaspoides amabilis Lefèvre, 1876 – Colombia
- Colaspoides amazona Jacoby, 1881 – Brazil (Amazonas)
- Colaspoides batesi Jacoby, 1879 – Costa Rica
- Colaspoides bicolor (Olivier, 1808) – Brazil (Amazonas, Pará), Peru
- Colaspoides cupreipennis Jacoby, 1880 – Ecuador
- Colaspoides elongata Jacoby, 1880 – Ecuador
- Colaspoides fasciata Lefèvre, 1875 – Colombia
- Colaspoides freyi Bechyné, 1955 – Venezuela
- Colaspoides fulgida Lefèvre, 1875 – Brazil (Central-West, Southwest, South), Paraguay, Argentina (Misiones, Chaco)
- Colaspoides hlisnikovskyi Bechyné, 1949 – Brazil (Amazonas)
- Colaspoides hypoxantha Lefèvre, 1885
  - Colaspoides hypoxantha hypoxantha Lefèvre, 1885 – Brazil (Amazonas)
  - Colaspoides hypoxantha nisotricollis Bechyné, 1954 – Brazil (Matto Grosso)
- Colaspoides igneicollis Lefèvre, 1886 – Peru
- Colaspoides inedita Lefèvre, 1876 – French Guiana, Brazil (Amapá)
- Colaspoides itaituba Bechyné & Bechyné, 1964 – Brazil (Pará)
- Colaspoides limbata (Fabricius, 1781) – Guyana, Brazil (Pará, Amazonas, Amapá), Suriname
- Colaspoides limbicollis Lefèvre, 1875 – French Guiana, Brazil (Pará, Amapá)
- Colaspoides marginata Jacoby, 1882 – Guatemala
- Colaspoides mera (Germar, 1824) – Brazil (Northeast)
- Colaspoides peruana Jacoby, 1879 – Peru
- Colaspoides quadriplagiata Jacoby, 1882 – Guatemala
- Colaspoides reticulata Lefèvre, 1876 – Brazil
- Colaspoides rufitarsis Lefèvre, 1875 – Brazil (Southwest, South), Costa Rica
- Colaspoides smaragdina Lefèvre, 1875 – Brazil
- Colaspoides tibialis (Germar, 1824) – Brazil (Rio de Janeiro)
- Colaspoides tibiella Bechyné, 1953 – Brazil (Southwest, South), Paraguay, Argentina (Misiones)
- Colaspoides unicolor Jacoby, 1879 – Nicaragua to Panama
- Colaspoides varicolor Lefèvre, 1878 – Colombia
- Colaspoides viridicollis Jacoby, 1878 – Brazil (Amazonas, Pará, Ceará)
- Colaspoides viridicornis Lefèvre, 1878 – Colombia

Palaearctic, Indomalaysian and Australasian species:

- Colaspoides acervata Lea, 1915 – Australia
- Colaspoides ahmadi Medvedev, 2010 – Borneo
- Colaspoides alexei Romantsov, 2024 – Borneo
- Colaspoides amamianus Komiya, 1998 – Ryukyu Islands (Amami Ōshima)
- Colaspoides angusticollis Jacoby, 1898 – Borneo
- Colaspoides annamita Medvedev, 2004 – Vietnam, Laos
- Colaspoides annandalei Jacoby, 1905 – Peninsular Malaysia? ("Bukit Besar")
- Colaspoides anomogastra Lea, 1915 – Australia
- Colaspoides antennata Medvedev, 2007 – Vietnam
- Colaspoides apicata Medvedev, 2004 – Vietnam
- Colaspoides apicicornis Jacoby, 1884 – Sumatra, Mentawai, Nias
- Colaspoides armata Medvedev, 2004 – Laos
- Colaspoides asarovi Romantsov & Moseyko, 2023 – Peninsular Malaysia
- Colaspoides bacboensis Medvedev, 2004 – Vietnam
- Colaspoides bakeri Medvedev, 2006 – Philippines
- Colaspoides balyana Medvedev, 2007 – Borneo
- Colaspoides basilana Medvedev, 2006 – Philippines
- Colaspoides bengalensis Duvivier, 1892 – Nepal, Northeast India
- Colaspoides bicarinata Lea, 1915 – Australia
- Colaspoides bicoloripes Medvedev, 2019 – Peninsular Malaysia
- Colaspoides bidentatus Medvedev, 2004 – Vietnam
- Colaspoides biplagiata Baly, 1867 – Borneo
- Colaspoides bolmi Medvedev, 2010 – Borneo
- Colaspoides borneoensis Jacoby, 1898 – Borneo
- Colaspoides borneomontana Romantsov & Moseyko, 2023 – Borneo
- Colaspoides brancuccii Medvedev, 2004 – East India (Darjeeling), Nepal
- Colaspoides brevicollis Jacoby, 1898 – Borneo
- Colaspoides bruneiensis Romantsov & Moseyko, 2023 – Borneo
- Colaspoides brunnea Bryant, 1957 – Fiji
- Colaspoides buechei Medvedev, 2008 – Sulawesi
- Colaspoides buonloicus Medvedev, 2004 – Vietnam
- Colaspoides caledonica Medvedev, 2007 – New Caledonia
- Colaspoides cameronensis Romantsov & Moseyko, 2023 – Malay Peninsula
- Colaspoides cantonensis Medvedev, 2004 – Southern China (Guangdong), Vietnam
- Colaspoides cariniventris Lea, 1926 – Australia
- Colaspoides cechovskyi Medvedev, 2016 – Peninsular Malaysia
- Colaspoides chakratongii (Chûjô, 1964) – Thailand
- Colaspoides chapuisi Medvedev, 2004 – Thailand
- Colaspoides cheni Medvedev, 2004 – Vietnam
- Colaspoides chinensis Jacoby, 1888 – Southern China, Korea
- Colaspoides ciliaticornis Medvedev, 2019 – Vietnam
- Colaspoides ciliatipes Lefèvre, 1890 – Philippines
- Colaspoides circumdatus Medvedev & Romantsov, 2014 – Borneo
- Colaspoides clavipes Medvedev, 2004 – "Ind. or", possibly from Myanmar
- Colaspoides coerulescens Baly, 1867 – Malay Peninsula
- Colaspoides coerulipes Baly, 1867 – Borneo
- Colaspoides cognata Baly, 1867 – Peninsular Malaysia (Penang Island, Pangkor Island)
- Colaspoides cognatella Medvedev, 2004 – Thailand, Vietnam
- Colaspoides cognatomima Medvedev, 2004 – Peninsular Malaysia
- Colaspoides complicata Lea, 1915 – Australia
- Colaspoides confusa Gressitt, 1957 – Fiji
- Colaspoides costalis Medvedev, 2004 – Southern China (Guangdong)
- Colaspoides costipennis Romantsov & Moseyko, 2023 – Borneo
- Colaspoides crassifemur Tan & Wang, 1984 – Southwestern China (Yunnan)
- Colaspoides crassipes Lea, 1915 – Australia
- Colaspoides cuprea Baly, 1867 – Thailand, Peninsular Malaysia, Singapore
- Colaspoides cupreicollis Jacoby, 1908 – Myanmar, Thailand
- Colaspoides cupreoviridis Lea, 1922 – Australia
- Colaspoides curticornis Medvedev, 2010 – Borneo
- Colaspoides curvipes Medvedev, 2004 – Vietnam
- Colaspoides daccordii Medvedev, 2004 – Vietnam
- Colaspoides dapi Medvedev, 2004 – Vietnam
- Colaspoides diffinis Lefèvre, 1893 – Vietnam
- Colaspoides dimorphus Medvedev, 2004 – Thailand
- Colaspoides doddi Lea, 1915 – Australia
- Colaspoides dohertii Jacoby, 1908 – Northeast India (Assam)
- Colaspoides dongnaicus Medvedev, 2012
- Colaspoides elegans Baly, 1867 – Peninsular Malaysia, Singapore
- Colaspoides elegantula Lea, 1915 – Australia
- Colaspoides elenae Medvedev & Romantsov, 2014 – Borneo
- †Colaspoides eocenicus Moseyko & Kirejtshuk, 2013 – Baltic amber, Eocene
- Colaspoides epichloris (Boisduval, 1835) – Solomon Islands (Vanikoro)
- Colaspoides excavativentris Lea, 1926 (excaviventris?) – Australia
- Colaspoides fasciculata Lea, 1921 – Australia
- Colaspoides feae Jacoby, 1882 – Myanmar, Thailand
- Colaspoides fedorenkoi Medvedev, 2012
- Colaspoides femoralis Lefèvre, 1885 – Southern China, Vietnam
- Colaspoides filimonovi Romantsov, 2024 – Java
- Colaspoides flavimana Medvedev, 2004 – Vietnam
- Colaspoides fontis Jolivet, Verma & Mille, 2008 – New Caledonia
- Colaspoides foveiventris Lea, 1915 – Australia
- Colaspoides frenchi Lea, 1915 – Australia
- Colaspoides fulvicornis (Baly, 1865) – Thailand
- Colaspoides fulvimana Jacoby, 1908 – Northeast India (Manipur, Meghalaya)
- Colaspoides fulvipes Lefèvre, 1889 – Vietnam
- Colaspoides fulvitarsis Jacoby, 1899 – Sumatra
- Colaspoides fulvorufa Medvedev, 2007 – Vietnam
- Colaspoides fulvus (Chûjô, 1935) – Ryukyu Islands
- Colaspoides fulvus Medvedev, 2015 (junior homonym of above) – Vietnam
- Colaspoides fuscoaenea Baly, 1867 – Borneo
- Colaspoides fuscoaenoides Romantsov, 2024 – Java
- Colaspoides geminata Weise, 1908 – Australia
- Colaspoides geniculatus Medvedev, 2004 – Thailand
- Colaspoides glabrata Jacoby, 1898 – Sumatra
- Colaspoides glabricollis Jacoby, 1908 – Myanmar
- Colaspoides gorbunovi Medvedev, 2010 – Borneo
- Colaspoides gratiosa (Baly, 1864) – Singapore
- Colaspoides gressitti Medvedev, 2004 – Vietnam
- Colaspoides gunungensis Romantsov & Moseyko, 2023 – Borneo
- Colaspoides haemorrhoidalis Lea, 1915 – Australia
- Colaspoides hainanensis Gressitt & Kimoto, 1961 – Southern China (Hainan)
- Colaspoides hageni Lefèvre, 1887 – Sumatra
- Colaspoides hagiangi Medvedev, 2004 – Vietnam
- Colaspoides heroni Lea, 1915 – Australia
- Colaspoides hoblerae Lea, 1915 – Australia
- Colaspoides howensis Lea, 1915 – Lord Howe Island
- Colaspoides icterica Weise, 1922 – Philippines
- Colaspoides imasakai Komiya, 1991 – Ryukyu Islands
- Colaspoides imitans Medvedev, 2004 – Vietnam
- Colaspoides inconspicua Jacoby, 1896 – Sumatra
- Colaspoides inornata Baly, 1867 – Peninsular Malaysia (Penang Island)
- Colaspoides insignis Baly, 1867 – Borneo
- Colaspoides iridipennis Jacoby, 1896 – Mentawai
- Colaspoides jacobyi Clavareau, 1914 – East India
- Colaspoides jacobyi Medvedev, 2004 (junior homonym of above) – "China"
- Colaspoides japanus Chûjô, 1956 – Japan (Kyushu, Koshikishima Islands, Tanegashima)
- Colaspoides javana Weise, 1924 – Java
- Colaspoides kabakovi Medvedev, 2004 – Vietnam
- Colaspoides kantneri Medvedev, 2004 – Peninsular Malaysia
- Colaspoides kasaharai Komiya, 1991 – Ryukyu Islands
- Colaspoides kelantana Medvedev, 2019 – Peninsular Malaysia
- Colaspoides kimotoi Medvedev, 2004 – Southern China (Hainan)
- Colaspoides klimenkoi Medvedev & Romantsov, 2014 – Borneo
- Colaspoides krausei Medvedev, 1988 – Philippines
- Colaspoides kubani Medvedev, 2004 – Thailand
- Colaspoides laeta Medvedev, 2004 – Thailand, Peninsular Malaysia
- Colaspoides laevicollis Lefèvre, 1887 – Sumatra
- Colaspoides lamellatus Medvedev, 2004 – Vietnam
- Colaspoides langbianicus Kimoto & Gressitt, 1982 – Vietnam
- Colaspoides laosensis Kimoto & Gressitt, 1982 – Laos, Thailand, Northeast India (Assam)
- Colaspoides laotica Medvedev, 2004 – Laos
- Colaspoides laportei Baly, 1867 (laportii?) – Peninsular Malaysia, Singapore
- Colaspoides lateralis Jacoby, 1900 – East India
- Colaspoides laticollis Jacoby, 1900 – "Bengal"
- Colaspoides latipalpis Romantsov & Moseyko, 2023 – Borneo
- Colaspoides laysi Medvedev, 2006 – Philippines
- Colaspoides leai Medvedev, 2000 – Australia
- Colaspoides lefevrei Jacoby, 1889 – Nias
- Colaspoides lobatus Medvedev, 2004 – Vietnam
- Colaspoides macgregori Medvedev, 2006 – Philippines
- Colaspoides malayana Jacoby, 1894 – Borneo
- Colaspoides malayensis Medvedev, 2004 – Peninsular Malaysia
- Colaspoides martini Lefèvre, 1885
  - Colaspoides martini martini Lefèvre, 1885 – Vietnam, Laos, Thailand
  - Colaspoides martini spinigerus Lefèvre, 1893 – Vietnam, Thailand, Myanmar
- Colaspoides medogensis Tan, 1989 – Southwestern China (Xizang)
- Colaspoides melanocephala Jacoby, 1908 – South India
- Colaspoides mentaweica Medvedev, 2003 – Mentawai
- Colaspoides metallactus Romantsov & Moseyko, 2023 – Borneo
- Colaspoides metallescens Medvedev, 2007 – Vietnam
- Colaspoides micans Baly, 1867 – Sulawesi
- Colaspoides microdentata Medvedev, 2004 – Vietnam
- Colaspoides mimeta Lea, 1915 – Australia
- Colaspoides mimica Medvedev, 2004 – Vietnam
- Colaspoides mindanaica Medvedev, 1988 – Philippines
- Colaspoides mindorensis Medvedev, 2006 – Philippines
- Colaspoides minimus Kimoto & Gressitt, 1982 – Vietnam, Laos
- Colaspoides mirabilis Medvedev, 2010 – Borneo
- Colaspoides miyatakei Kimoto, 1967 – Southern China (Hong Kong)
- Colaspoides modesta Baly, 1867 – Borneo
- Colaspoides modiglianii Jacoby, 1896 – Sumatra
- Colaspoides montana Jacoby, 1900 – Northeast India (Assam, Meghalaya)
- Colaspoides morimotoi Kimoto, 1967 – Southern China (Hong Kong)
- Colaspoides multicostata Medvedev, 2007
- Colaspoides napolovi Medvedev, 2012 – Vietnam
- Colaspoides negrosana Medvedev, 2006 – Philippines
- Colaspoides nepalensis Kimoto, 2001 – Nepal
- Colaspoides nikandrovitshi Romantsov & Moseyko, 2023 – Peninsular Malaysia
- Colaspoides nitidicollis Medvedev, 2010 – Borneo
- Colaspoides nigricornis Jacoby, 1884 – Sumatra, Malay Peninsula
- Colaspoides nigripes Jacoby, 1884 – Sumatra
- Colaspoides nigritarsis Jacoby, 1885 – Sumatra
- Colaspoides nigrotibialis Medvedev, 2004 – Vietnam
- Colaspoides norfolcensis Lea, 1915 – Norfolk Island
- Colaspoides obscuripes Medvedev, 2010 – Borneo
- Colaspoides okinawanus Komiya, 1991 – Ryukyu Islands (Okinawa Island)
- Colaspoides okumai Komiya, 1991 – Taiwan
- Colaspoides olegi Medvedev, 2004 – Vietnam
- Colaspoides opaca Jacoby, 1888 – Southern China
- Colaspoides ovalis Lefèvre, 1890 – Laos
- Colaspoides paddis Aslam, 1968 – Southern China (Jiangxi)
- Colaspoides pahangensis Romantsov & Moseyko, 2023 – Peninsular Malaysia
- Colaspoides pallidicornis Tan & Zhou, 1997 – Southern China (Fujian)
- Colaspoides pangrangensis Romantsov, 2024 – Java
- Colaspoides paraviolacea Romantsov & Moseyko, 2023 – Borneo
- Colaspoides parrotti Medvedev, 2006 – Philippines
- Colaspoides parvidens Lea, 1915 – Australia
- Colaspoides parvula Baly, 1867 – Singapore, Peninsular Malaysia, Sumatra
- Colaspoides patrikeevi Moseyko & Romantsov, 2022 – Southwestern China (Sichuan)
- Colaspoides persicariae Chûjô, 1956 – Taiwan
- Colaspoides persimilis Kimoto & Gressitt, 1982 – Laos, Vietnam
- Colaspoides philippinensis Baly, 1867 – Philippines
- Colaspoides picea Baly, 1867 – Singapore
- Colaspoides piceana Medvedev, 2004 – Vietnam, Laos
- Colaspoides picipes Weise, 1908 – Australia
- Colaspoides picticornis Lea, 1915 – Australia
- Colaspoides pictipes Lea, 1915 – Australia
- Colaspoides pilicornis Lefèvre, 1882 – Southern China, Vietnam,
- Colaspoides planifrons Jacoby, 1900 – "Bengal"
- Colaspoides pleuralis Medvedev, 2010 – Borneo
- Colaspoides poeciloderma Lea, 1915 – Australia
- Colaspoides polilovi Medvedev, 2010 – Vietnam
- Colaspoides prasinella Medvedev, 2004 – Thailand
- Colaspoides prasinomima Medvedev, 2007 – Vietnam
- Colaspoides prasinus Lefèvre, 1890
  - Colaspoides prasinus occidentalis Medvedev, 2004 – Thailand, Vietnam
  - Colaspoides prasinus prasinus Lefèvre, 1890 – Laos
- Colaspoides pseudodiffinis Medvedev, 2004 – Southern China (Fujian)
- Colaspoides pseudofemoralis Romantsov & Moseyko, 2019 – Vietnam
- Colaspoides pseudomodesta Medvedev, 2010 – Borneo
- Colaspoides pseudorufa Medvedev, 2015 – Vietnam
- Colaspoides pulchella Clark, 1865 – Peninsular Malaysia (Penang)
- Colaspoides puncticeps Baly, 1867 – Peninsular Malaysia, Singapore
- Colaspoides punctipleuris Medvedev, 2003 – Borneo
- Colaspoides purpurascens Medvedev, 2015 – Bali
- Colaspoides purpurata Medvedev, 2006 – Philippines
- Colaspoides quadripartita Baly, 1867 – Singapore
- Colaspoides quieta Lea, 1915 – Australia
- Colaspoides rafflesii Baly, 1867 – Sumatra
- Colaspoides rara Lea, 1915 – Australia
- Colaspoides rectilatera Lea, 1915 – Australia
- Colaspoides regalini Medvedev, 2004 – Vietnam
- Colaspoides regularis Baly, 1867 – Borneo, Java
- Colaspoides riedeli Medvedev, 2010 – Borneo
- Colaspoides robusta Baly, 1867 – Borneo
- Colaspoides rubra Medvedev, 2010 – Borneo
- Colaspoides rufa Gressitt & Kimoto, 1961 – Southern China (Jiangxi, Guangdong)
- Colaspoides rufipes Kimoto & Gressitt, 1982 – Vietnam
- Colaspoides rufiventris Medvedev, 2006 – Philippines
- Colaspoides rufofulva Medvedev, 2004 – Vietnam
- Colaspoides rugipennis (Motschulsky, 1860) – Thailand, Laos, Vietnam, Malay Peninsula
- Colaspoides rugipennis Lefèvre, 1893 (junior homonym of above) – Cambodia, Laos, Thailand
- Colaspoides rugulosus Lefèvre, 1889 – Vietnam, Laos
- Colaspoides sabahensis Medvedev, 2010 – Borneo
- Colaspoides sandakana Medvedev, 2010 – Borneo
- Colaspoides sarawacensis Medvedev, 2010 – Borneo
- Colaspoides sarrameae Jolivet, Verma & Mille, 2008 – New Caledonia
- Colaspoides sauteri Chûjô, 1956 – Taiwan
- Colaspoides schawalleri Medvedev, 2010 – Borneo
- Colaspoides schulzi Medvedev, 2007 – Thailand
- Colaspoides sculpturata Medvedev, 2006 – Philippines
- Colaspoides semipicea Jacoby, 1895 – South India
- Colaspoides serratipes Medvedev, 2013 – Vietnam
- Colaspoides seticornis Medvedev, 2004 – Vietnam
- Colaspoides shapaensis Medvedev, 2004 – Vietnam
- Colaspoides shuteae Medvedev, 2010 – Borneo
- Colaspoides siamensis Jacoby, 1905 – Thailand
- Colaspoides similis Lea, 1915 – Australia
- Colaspoides simillima Baly, 1867 – Peninsular Malaysia, Singapore
- Colaspoides simplicipennis Jacoby, 1885 – Australia
- Colaspoides speciosa Lefèvre, 1887 – Bangka
- Colaspoides staudingeri Medvedev, 2010 – Borneo
- Colaspoides striatopunctata (Boisduval, 1835) – Australia
- Colaspoides suavis Lea, 1915 – Australia
- Colaspoides subfasciata Medvedev, 2019 – Peninsular Malaysia
- Colaspoides sublaevicollis Duvivier, 1892 – Northeast India (Sikkim), "Bengal"
- Colaspoides submetallica Medvedev, 2010 – Borneo
- Colaspoides subovata Medvedev, 2004 – Thailand
- Colaspoides subtuberculata Medvedev, 2006 – Philippines
- Colaspoides suginoi Komiya, 1988 – Ryukyu Islands (Tokunoshima)
- Colaspoides sulawensis Medvedev, 2008 – Sulawesi
- Colaspoides sumatrensis Jacoby, 1884 – Sumatra
- Colaspoides taiwanus Chûjô, 1956 – Taiwan
- Colaspoides takizawai Medvedev, 2010 – Borneo
- Colaspoides tamdaoensis Medvedev, 2004 – Vietnam
- Colaspoides tarsalis Lea, 1915 – Australia
- Colaspoides tenenbaumi Pic, 1942 – China
- Colaspoides tenuicornis Medvedev, 2010 – Borneo
- Colaspoides thailandicus Kimoto & Gressitt, 1982 – Thailand
- Colaspoides tridentata Medvedev, 2004 – Singapore
- Colaspoides trusmadiensis Medvedev & Romantsov, 2014 – Borneo
- Colaspoides tuberculata Baly, 1867 – Borneo
- Colaspoides tuberculipennis Medvedev, 1988 – Philippines
- Colaspoides varians Baly, 1867 – Java
- Colaspoides ventralis Medvedev, 2018 – Thailand
- Colaspoides venusta Lefèvre, 1889 – Sumatra
- Colaspoides vietnamicus Kimoto & Gressitt, 1982 – Vietnam
- Colaspoides violacea Baly, 1867 – Borneo
- Colaspoides viridana Baly, 1867 – Sulawesi
- Colaspoides viridimarginata Baly, 1867 – Borneo
- Colaspoides viridipennis Weise, 1923 – Australia
- Colaspoides viridiventris Medvedev, 2010 – Borneo
- Colaspoides vitiensis Bryant, 1938 – Fiji
- Colaspoides vityukovae Romantsov & Moseyko, 2023 – Borneo
- Colaspoides vocki Medvedev, 2007 – Thailand
- Colaspoides volkovi Medvedev & Romantsov, 2014 – Borneo
- Colaspoides weisei Medvedev, 2006 – Philippines
- Colaspoides yunnanicus Medvedev, 2004 – Southwestern China (Yunnan)
- Colaspoides zoiai Medvedev, 2004 – Vietnam

Renamed species:

- Colaspoides aeneoviridis Romantsov & Moseyko, 2023 (preoccupied by C. aeneoviride Clark, 1865): renamed to Colaspoides alexei Romantsov, 2024
- Colaspoides malayana Medvedev, 1998 (preoccupied by C. malayana Jacoby, 1894): renamed to Colaspoides malayensis Medvedev, 2004
- Colaspoides pallidula Lea, 1915 (preoccupied by C. pallidula Jacoby, 1889): renamed to Colaspoides leai Medvedev, 2000
- Colaspoides piceus Kimoto & Gressitt, 1982 (preoccupied by C. picea Baly, 1867): renamed to Colaspoides piceana Medvedev, 2004
- Colaspoides purpurata Medvedev & Takizawa, 2011 (preoccupied by C. purpurata Medvedev, 2006) renamed to Colaspoides purpurascens Medvedev, 2015
- Colaspoides tarsalis Chen, 1935 (preoccupied by C. tarsalis Lea, 1915): renamed to Colaspoides paddis Aslam, 1968
- Colaspoides tibialis Lefèvre, 1875 (preoccupied by C. tibialis (Germar, 1824)): renamed to Colaspoides tibiella Bechyné, 1953

Synonyms:

- Colaspoides discoidea Lefèvre, 1891: synonym of Colaspoides viridicollis Jacoby, 1878
- Colaspoides fruhstorferi Jacoby, 1898: synonym of Colaspoides robusta Baly, 1867
- Colaspoides imasakai yakuanus Komiya, 1991: synonym of Colaspoides imasakai Komiya, 1991
- Colaspoides opulenta Jacoby, 1900: synonym of Colaspoides fasciata Lefèvre, 1875
- Colaspoides paviei Lefèvre, 1890: synonym of Colaspoides rugipennis (Motschulsky, 1860)
- Colaspoides phalerata Weise, 1922: synonym of Colaspoides philippinensis Baly, 1867
- Colaspoides subrugosa Jacoby, 1908: synonym of Colaspoides bengalensis Duvivier, 1892

Species transferred to Beltia:

- Colaspoides chanchamayensis Bechyné, 1950: now a synonym of Beltia weyrauchi (Bechyné, 1950)
- Colaspoides chiriquensis Jacoby, 1882: now Beltia chiriquensis (Jacoby, 1882)
- Colaspoides placidula Bechyné, 1950: now Beltia placidula (Bechyné, 1950)
- Colaspoides placidula angustomarginata Bechyné, 1953: now Beltia angustomarginata (Bechyné, 1953)
- Colaspoides turialbana Bechyné, 1950: now a synonym of Beltia chiriquensis (Jacoby, 1882)
- Colaspoides weyrauchi Bechyné, 1950: now Beltia weyrauchi (Bechyné, 1950)

Species transferred to Aulacia:

- Colaspoides bicoloricollis Medvedev & Romantsov, 2014 – Borneo
- Colaspoides cyaneipennis Medvedev, 2010 – Borneo
- Colaspoides minuta Medvedev, 1995 – Philippines
