= ADERERROR =

South Korean fashion brand

- Industry: Fashion
- Headquarters: Seongsu, Seoul, South Korea
- Products: Clothing, accessories
- Parent: FIVE SPACE Co., Ltd.
- Website: https://www.adererror.com/

ADERERROR is a South Korean fashion brand established in 2014. It specializes in the design, production, and sale of clothing, accessories, and other fashion products. The brand is operated by FIVE SPACE Co., Ltd.

== History ==
ADERERROR was founded in Seoul, South Korea, in December 2014 by a collective of creative professionals from various fields, including fashion, graphic design, and illustration. The brand developed through a collaborative approach to fashion and visual design.

In 2018, ADERERROR expanded its international presence through collaborations with Puma and Maison Kitsuné. The partnerships continued with subsequent collections over the following years.

In 2021, ADERERROR collaborated with Zara on the "AZ Collection", which was released in 10 countries. The two brands released another collection, "CYCLE A TO Z", in 2022. The same year, ADERERROR also collaborated with Birkenstock.

In 2023, ADERERROR began a collaboration with Converse, releasing two collections during the year. In 2025, the two brands released a third collection, titled "Re-found".

The brand continued to expand its retail operations, opening additional stores in Seoul in 2025 and its first flagship store in mainland China, located in Shanghai, in October of that year.

== Ambassador ==
- Byeon Woo-seok
