= Purvis Eureka =

Australian sports car/kit car

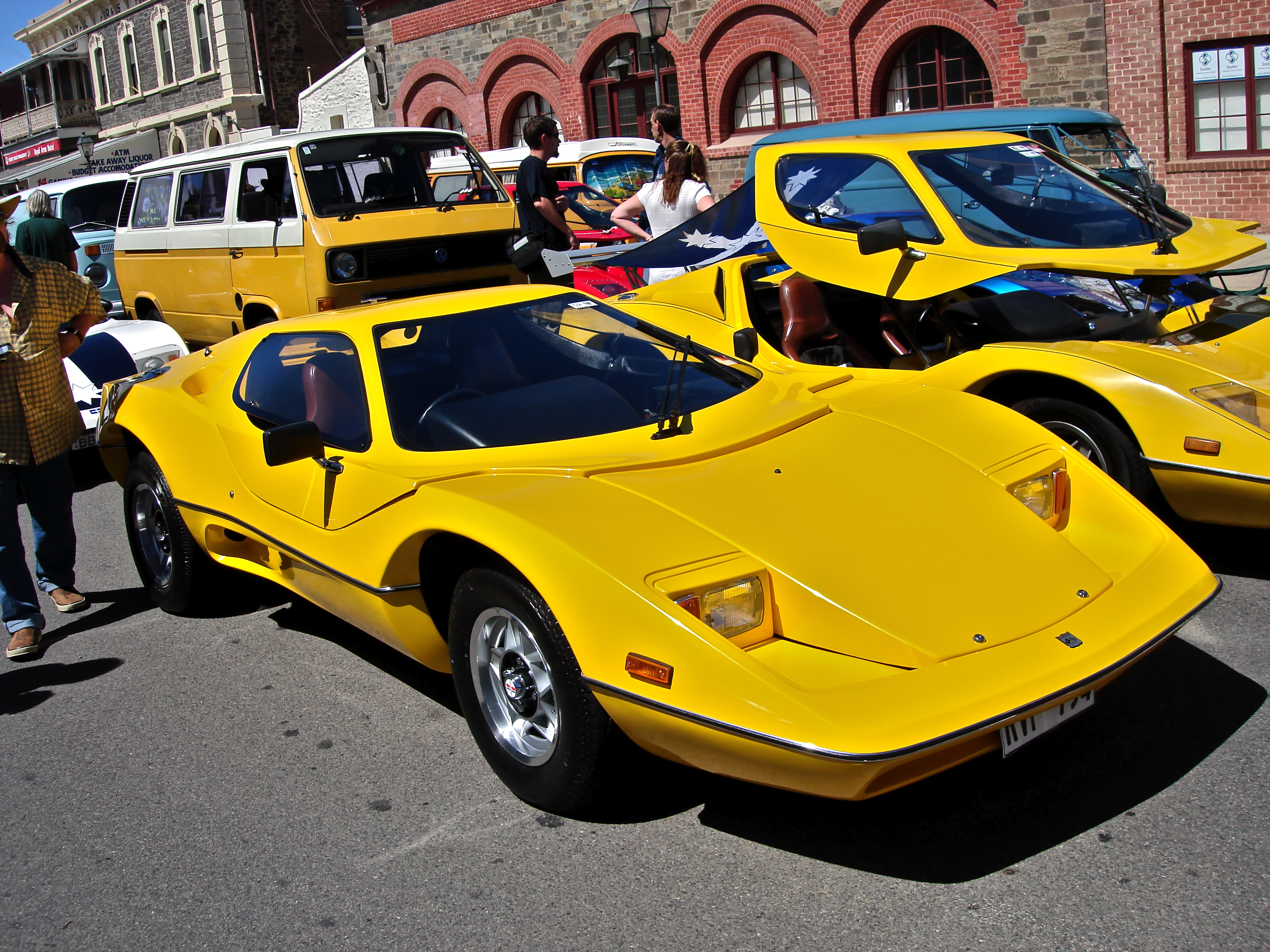

Overview
- Manufacturer: Purvis Cars
- Production: 1974–1991
- Designer: Allan Purvis

Body and chassis
- Class: Sports car Kit car
- Body style: Coupé; Targa coupe
- Layout: Rear-engine, rear-wheel drive
- Platform: Volkswagen Beetle
- Related: Nova

Powertrain
- Engine: 1.6L VW air-cooled F4; 2.0L VW air-cooled F4; 1.6L Ford Kent I4; 2.0L Ford EAO I4; Mazda Rotary Wankel
- Transmission: Volkswagen four-speed

Dimensions
- Wheelbase: 2,400 mm (94.5 in)
- Length: 4,420 mm (174.0 in)
- Width: 1,753 mm (69.0 in)
- Height: 1,067 mm (42.0 in)
- Curb weight: 700 kg (1,543 lb)

The Purvis Eureka is a sports car which was produced by Purvis Cars from 1974 to 1991 in Dandenong, Victoria, Australia.

It was first exhibited at the 1974 Melbourne International Motor Show, and was based on the British Nova kit car. The name was a tribute to the Eureka Stockade, with Purvis Cars also adopting the Eureka Flag as its logo. It utilised a Volkswagen Beetle chassis, and had a fibreglass body. The Eureka was offered both as a kit car and as a fully assembled vehicle.

The canopy model had no doors, with access being through a manually operated one-piece canopy, which was later replaced by a powered canopy. A targa top version was also available from the 1980s onward.

The Eureka was available with several engine options: a flat-four Volkswagen air-cooled engine, Ford straight-four engines, or Mazda Wankel engine. The 1.6-litre Volkswagen engine produced 48 kW (64 hp), the Volkswagen engines having a fuel economy of 8.8 L/100 km (32.1 mpg_{‑imp}).

Three models of the Eureka were produced:

- Purvis Eureka Sport (1974–1975)
- Purvis Eureka PL30 (1975–1976)
- Purvis Eureka F4 (1976–1991)

A total of 683 units were produced. Some 235 units of the Eureka Sports were produced. New Zealand production started in 1977, ending in 1990.

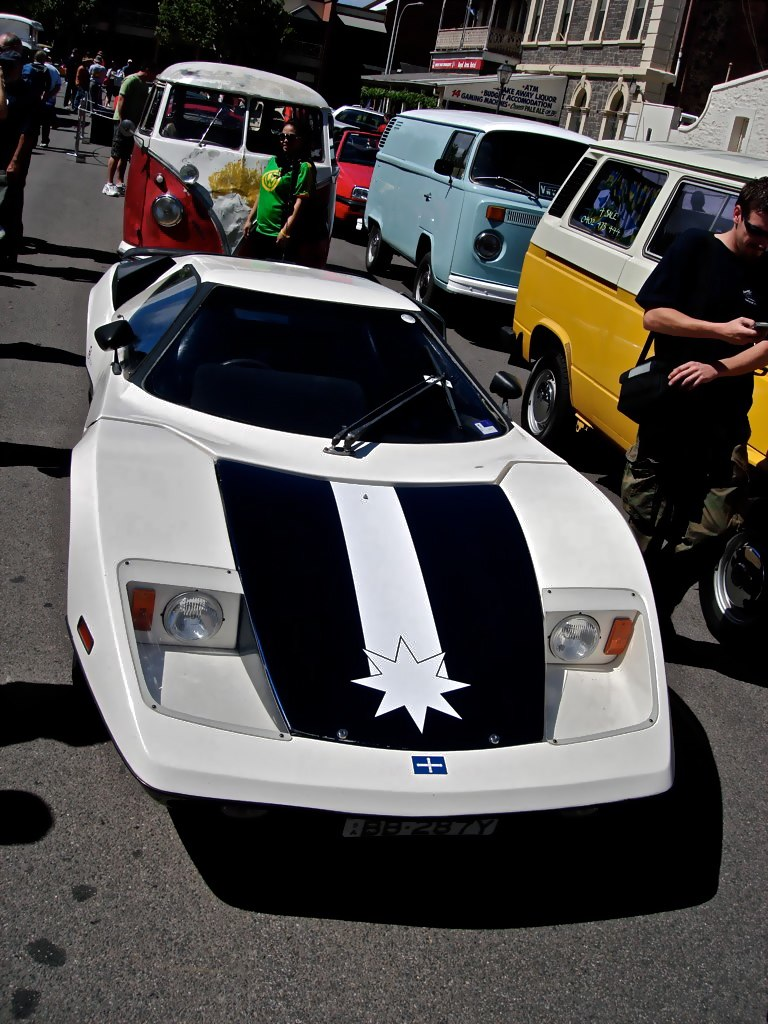
Purvis Eureka with bonnet flag

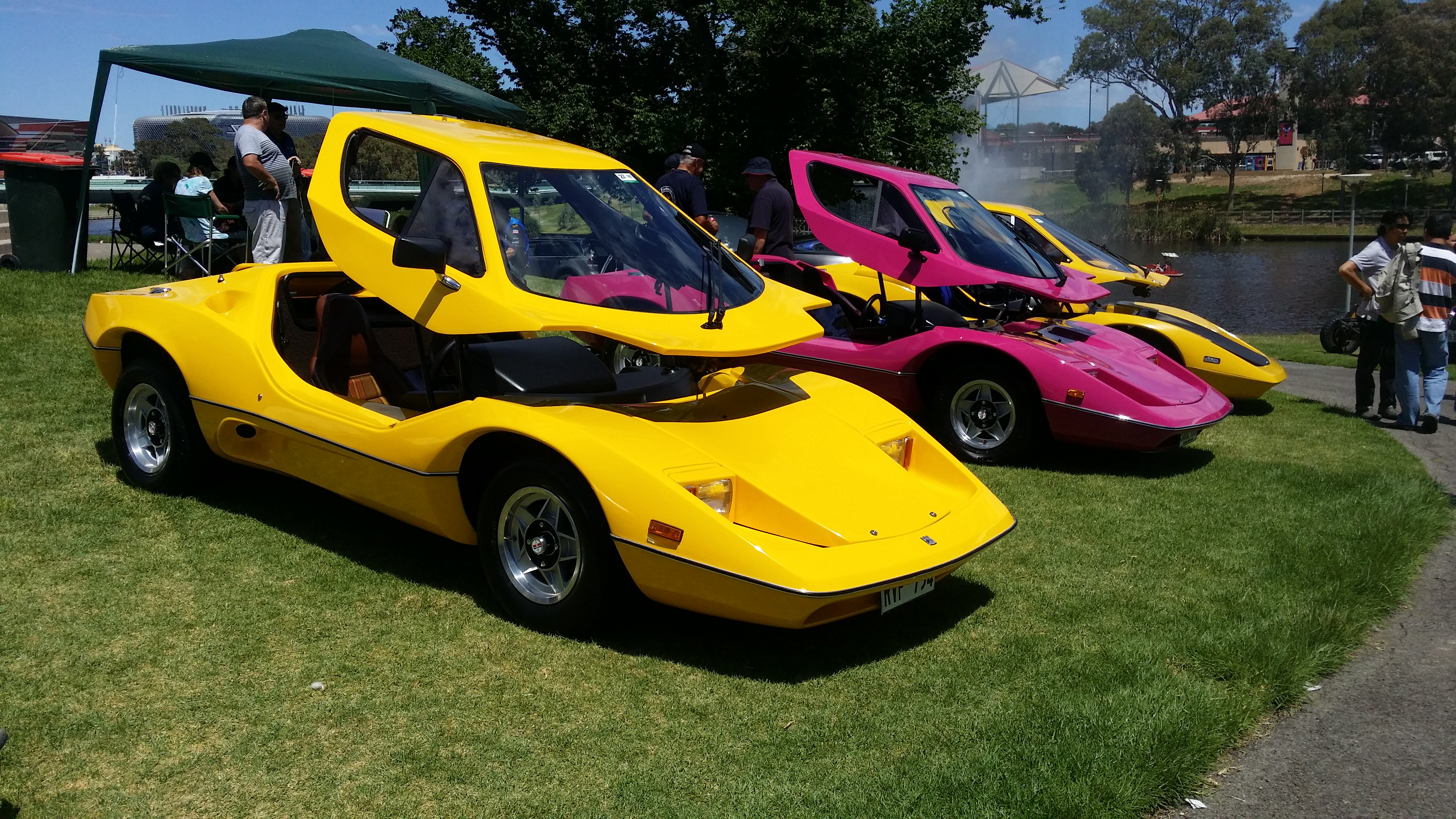
Purvis Eureka F4
