= Tanema language =

Endangered Oceanic language of the Solomon Islands

Tanema
- Tetawo
- Native to: Solomon Islands
- Region: Vanikoro
- Native speakers: 1 (2012)
- Language family: Austronesian: Malayo-Polynesian; Oceanic; Temotu; Vanikoro; Tanema

Language codes
- ISO 639-3: tnx
- Glottolog: tane1237
- ELP: Tanema
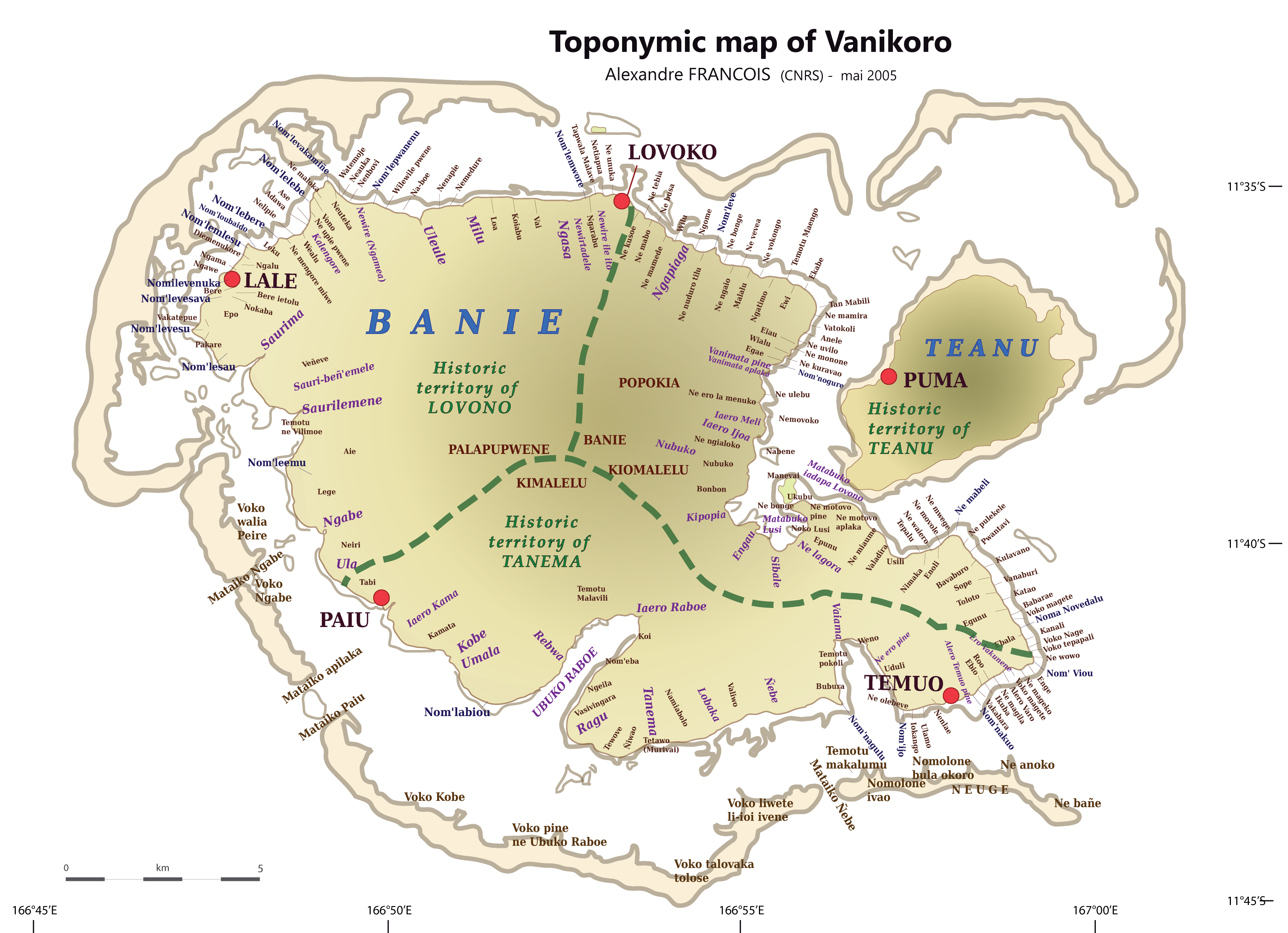
- Map of the island of Vanikoro, showing the historical territories of the three tribes of Lovono, Tanema and Teanu

- Tanema is classified as Critically Endangered by the UNESCO Atlas of the World's Languages in Danger.

Tanema (Tetawo, Tetau) is a nearly extinct language of the island of Vanikoro, in the easternmost province of the Solomon Islands.

== Vitality ==
As of 2012, Tanema is only spoken by one speaker, Lainol Nalo. Like its neighbour Lovono, it has been replaced by Teanu, the main language of Vanikoro.

The late Emele Mamuli was a prolific storyteller who could speak fluently the three languages of Vanikoro: Teanu, Lovono and Tanema. She was one of the last speakers of Tanema.

== The language ==
Some information on the languages of Vanikoro, including Tanema, can be found in François (2009) for the grammar, and François (2021) for the lexicon.
