= Beltia =

Scientific classification
- Kingdom: Animalia
- Phylum: Arthropoda
- Clade: Pancrustacea
- Class: Insecta
- Order: Coleoptera
- Suborder: Polyphaga
- Infraorder: Cucujiformia
- Family: Chrysomelidae
- Subfamily: Eumolpinae
- Tribe: Eumolpini
- Genus: Beltia; Jacoby, 1881

Type species
- Beltia nicaraguensis Jacoby, 1881

Genus of beetles

Beltia is a genus of leaf beetles in the subfamily Eumolpinae. It is known from the Neotropical realm. It was first erected by Martin Jacoby in 1881 for a single species from Nicaragua. In 2018, it was redefined to include fourteen new species from Central America and northwestern South America, as well as four species transferred from Colaspoides.

== Species ==
- Beltia angustomarginata (Bechyné, 1953) – central Panama
- Beltia awapita Flowers, 2018 – northwestern Ecuador
- Beltia chiriquensis (Jacoby, 1882) – central Costa Rica to eastern Panama
- Beltia confusa Flowers, 2018 – Amazonian Peru
- Beltia gorgona Flowers, 2018 – Pacific coast of Colombia
- Beltia herreri Flowers, 2018 – northwestern Costa Rica, northwestern Panama
- Beltia ledesmae Flowers, 2018 – Ecuador west of the Andes
- Beltia napoensis Flowers, 2018 – Ecuador, Peru, Colombia (collected along the Napo River)
- Beltia nicaraguensis Jacoby, 1881 – southern Nicaragua, northern Costa Rica
- Beltia osa Flowers, 2018 – Costa Rica–Panama border
- Beltia placidula (Bechyné, 1950) – Amazonian region of northern Peru
- Beltia rugosa Flowers, 2018 – Pacific coast of Colombia
- Beltia sanchezae Flowers, 2018 – Costa Rica (Cordillera de Talamanca)
- Beltia talaga Flowers, 2018 – eastern slope of the Ecuadorian Andes
- Beltia tilarana Flowers, 2018 – Costa Rica (Cordillera de Tilarán)
- Beltia tisingalita Flowers, 2018 – Costa Rica–Panama border (Cordillera de Talamanca)
- Beltia tsachila Flowers, 2018 – western slope of the Ecuadorian Andes
- Beltia vacilona Flowers, 2018 – Costa Rica
- Beltia weyrauchi (Bechyné, 1950) – eastern Peruvian Andes
