= Lovono language =

Endangered Oceanic language of the Solomon Islands

Lovono
- Alavana
- Native to: Solomon Islands
- Region: Vanikoro
- Native speakers: 4 (2012)
- Language family: Austronesian: Malayo-Polynesian; Oceanic; Temotu; Vanikoro; Lovono

Language codes
- ISO 639-3: vnk
- Glottolog: vano1237
- ELP: Vano
- Lovono is classified as Critically Endangered by the UNESCO Atlas of the World's Languages in Danger.

Lovono (Vano, Alavano, Alavana) is a nearly extinct language of the island of Vanikoro in the easternmost province of the Solomon Islands. As of 2012, it is only spoken by four speakers; it has been replaced by the island's dominant language, Teanu.

== Name ==
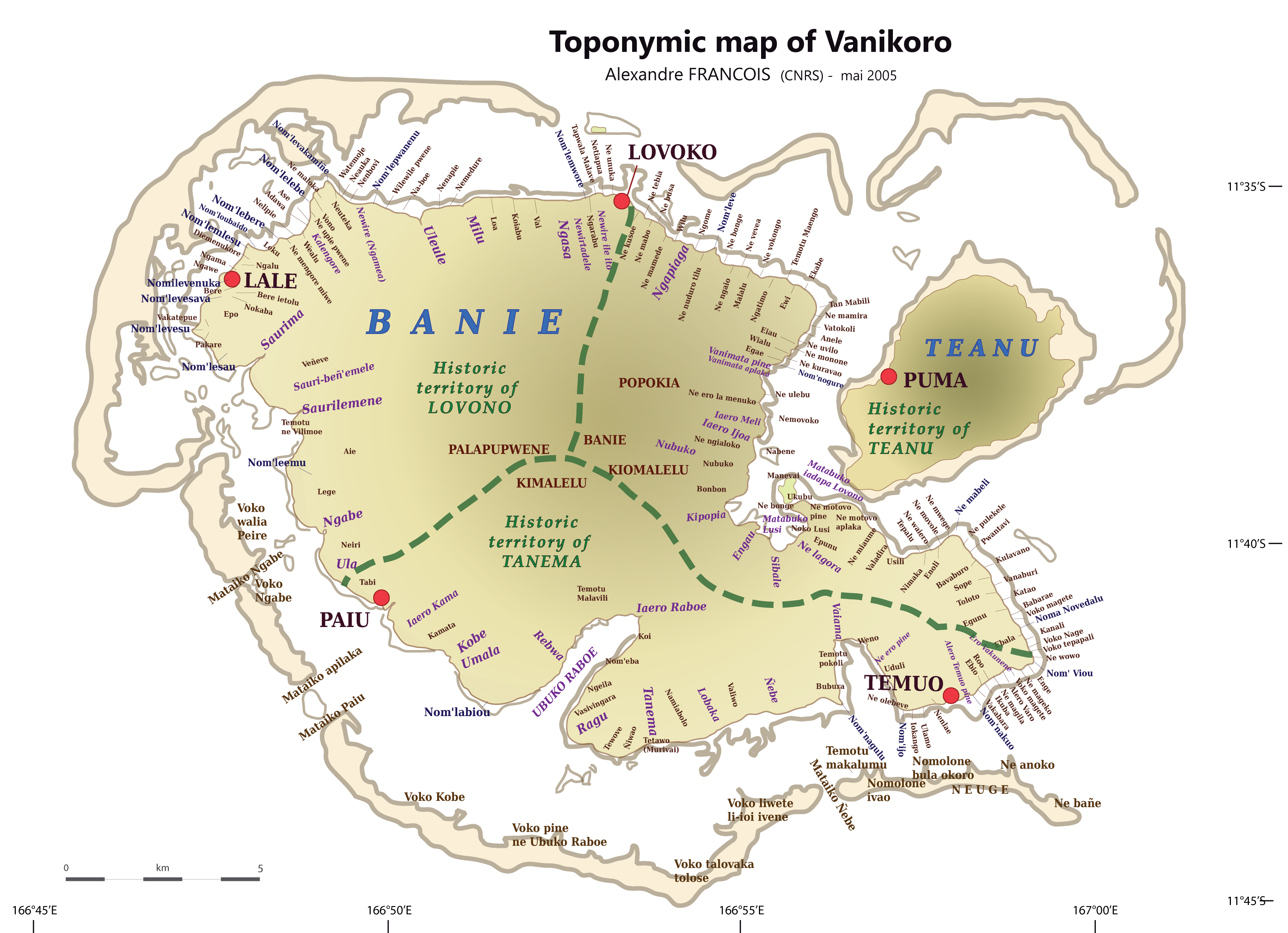
Map of Vanikoro I., showing the historical territories of the three tribes of Lovono, Tanema and Teanu

The language name makes reference to an ancient village in the northwest of the island Banie. In the language Lovono, which was once the dominant one in that area, the village was called Alavana. In Teanu, which is now the only language spoken by the modern population, the same village is called Lovono. This language shift is reflected in the people's preference to use the Teanu form (i.e. Lovono) both for the village name and for the ancient language that used to be associated with it.

The same village – and hence the language – has been also spelled Whanou or Vano in the scientific literature, possibly reflecting an older pronunciation of the word.

== The language ==
Some information on the languages of Vanikoro, including Lovono, can be found in François (2009) for the grammar, and François (2021) for the lexicon.
