= Mongrel2 =

Open source web server

- Developer: Zed A. Shaw
- Stable release: 1.13.0 / December 24, 2021; 4 years ago
- Written in: C
- Operating system: Unix-like
- Type: Web server
- License: Revised BSD License
- Website: mongrel2.org
- Repository: github.com/mongrel2/mongrel2

Mongrel2 is an open-source "language agnostic" web server written by Zed Shaw, and is the successor to Shaw's Mongrel server. The server supports HTTP, Flash XMLSockets, WebSockets and long polling connections.

== Language agnostic ==
Mongrel2 is described as language agnostic, meaning it does not prefer any specific programming language over another. The server's documentation says:

The term 'language agnostic' came from people who read about Mongrel2 in the early days, and it means that Mongrel2 does not try to promote any one language over any others.

== Development ==
Shaw began working on the server in June 2010 and released version 1.0 of the software on September 1, 2010. Mongrel2 has nothing in common with the original Mongrel webserver, except for using the same HTTP parser.
