= Zed Shaw =

Software developer

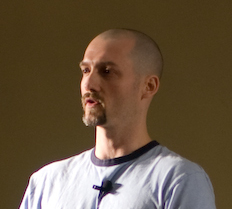
- Shaw in Montreal, 2008
- Occupation: Software developer

Zed A. Shaw is a software developer best known for creating the Learn Code the Hard Way series of programming tutorials, as well as for creating the Mongrel web server for Ruby web applications. He is also well known for his controversial views on programming languages and communities.

== Software ==
Shaw authored the Mongrel web server for Ruby web applications. Mongrel was the first web server used by Twitter, and inspired Node.js, according to its creator Ryan Dahl. Mongrel2 is the language-agnostic successor to Mongrel.

He has also written a Python mail server called Lamson, on which the mailing list site LibreList is built.

=== Learn Code the Hard Way ===
Shaw is the author of learncodethehardway.org, which offers to teach users Python, Ruby, C, Regex, and SQL.

== Polemics and controversies ==
Shaw has been outspoken in his criticism of certain programming languages and technical communities.

=== Ruby on Rails ===
His most famous and well-covered piece was the article "Rails is a Ghetto" which has since been removed from his site.

=== Criticism of Learn C the Hard Way and Shaw’s views on The C Programming Language ===
His book Learn C the Hard Way has drawn criticism for its technical inaccuracies, misleading explanations of C concepts, pedagogical shortcomings, and a presentation that some critics consider confusing for novice programmers.

Furthermore, Shaw’s view on The C Programming Language by Brian Kernighan and Dennis Ritchie, often referred to as K&R, has also been scrutinized.

Critics contend that his critique misrepresents the original text by evaluating code examples outside their intended context, attributing defects to the book that appear only when examples are modified or misused, employing faulty reasoning, and characterising established C idioms as inherently flawed rather than context dependent. Shaw has since acknowledged shortcomings in his critique of K&R.

=== Opposition to Python 3 ===
"There is a high probability that Python 3 is such a failure it will kill Python." - Zed Shaw

Shaw has a long-standing rant opposing Python 3, where he finds the new string type difficult to use, and as a result he believes that it should not be adopted. Nonetheless, in February 2017, he published a first draft of Learn Python 3 The Hard Way.

He stated in November 2016 that "Python 3 is not Turing complete" due to claims from Python project developers that Python 2 code cannot be made to run in the Python 3 VM. This statement has drawn a lot of criticism.

=== Criticism of certain behaviors within startup culture ===
Shaw has spoken about the amounts of vague and misleading information that is pervasive in the startup and entrepreneur culture, particularly concerning self-proclaimed startup advisors or entrepreneurship "gurus", having demonstrated publicly how some notable figures in the industry appear to speak and provide advice from a background of success that they never actually attained.

Shaw is also behind an initiative entitled "Programming, Motherfucker", whose manifesto claims that programmers are "tired of being told we're socially awkward idiots who need to be manipulated to work in a forced pair programming chain gang."

== Books ==
- Mongrel (Digital Shortcut): Serving, Deploying, and Extending Your Ruby Applications. Addison-Wesley Professional, 2006. ISBN 9780132701778
- Professional Ruby Collection: Mongrel, Rails Plugins, Rails Routing, Refactoring to REST, and Rubyisms CD1 (Ruby Series). Addison-Wesley Professional, 2007. ISBN 0132417995
- Learn Python the Hard Way. Self-published (1st and 2nd Editions), 2010 and 2011. ISBN 978-0321884916 and ISBN 978-1257853212
- The Command Line Crash Course. Self-published, 2011.
- Learn Regex the Hard Way. Self-published, 2011.
- Learn SQL the Hard Way. Self-published, 2011.
- Learn Python the Hard Way: A Very Simple Introduction to the Terrifyingly Beautiful World of Computers and Code 3rd edition. Republished under Addison-Wesley Professional, 2013. ISBN 978-0321884916
- Learn Ruby the Hard Way: A Simple and Idiomatic Introduction to the Imaginative World Of Computational Thinking with Code. Addison-Wesley Professional, 2014 ISBN 978-0321884992
- Learn C the Hard Way: Practical Exercises on the Computational Subjects You Keep Avoiding (Like C) (Zed Shaw's Hard Way Series). Addison-Wesley Professional, 2015. ISBN 978-0321884923
- Mongrel: Learn to Build the Greatest Ruby Web Server Ever. Addison-Wesley Professional, 2015. ISBN 978-0321503091
- Learn Python 3 the Hard Way: A Very Simple Introduction to the Terrifyingly Beautiful World of Computers and Code (Zed Shaw's Hard Way Series). Addison-Wesley Professional, 2017. ISBN 978-0134692883
