= Unicorn (web server) =

HTTP server for Ruby

- Original author: Eric Wong
- Developer: Unicorn developers
- Initial release: March 11, 2009; 16 years ago
- Stable release: 6.1.0 / 25 December 2021; 4 years ago
- Repository: yhbt.net/unicorn/
- Written in: Ruby
- Operating system: Cross-platform
- Available in: English
- Type: Web server
- License: GPLv2+ or Ruby 1.8
- Website: yhbt.net/unicorn/

Unicorn is a Rack HTTP server to serve Ruby web applications on a UNIX operating environment. It is optimised to be used with nginx. It is based on now deprecated Mongrel 1.1.5 from 2008.

== Architecture ==
Unicorn uses a master/worker architecture, where a master process forks worker processes and controls them. The application runs in a single thread.

== Reception and use ==
Unicorn was considered to be “one of the most popular servers for Rails”.

Twitter started to test Unicorn in 2010.

This server is shipped with Discourse. Their system administrator Sam Saffron noted Unicorn was reliable, as it reaps unresponsive workers.

Unicorn has inspired other projects like Gunicorn, a fork to run Python applications.

As of 2018, projects tend to favour Puma. The Heroku hosting provider recommends since 2015 to migrate from Unicorn to Puma. Deliveroo published a benchmark comparing the two servers and concluded “Puma performs better than Unicorn in all tests that were either heavily IO-bound or that interleaved IO and CPU work”, but that Unicorn was still slightly better performing in pure CPU situations. GitLab switched to Puma from Unicorn in 2020.
