= Automotive Design and Development =

British carmaker

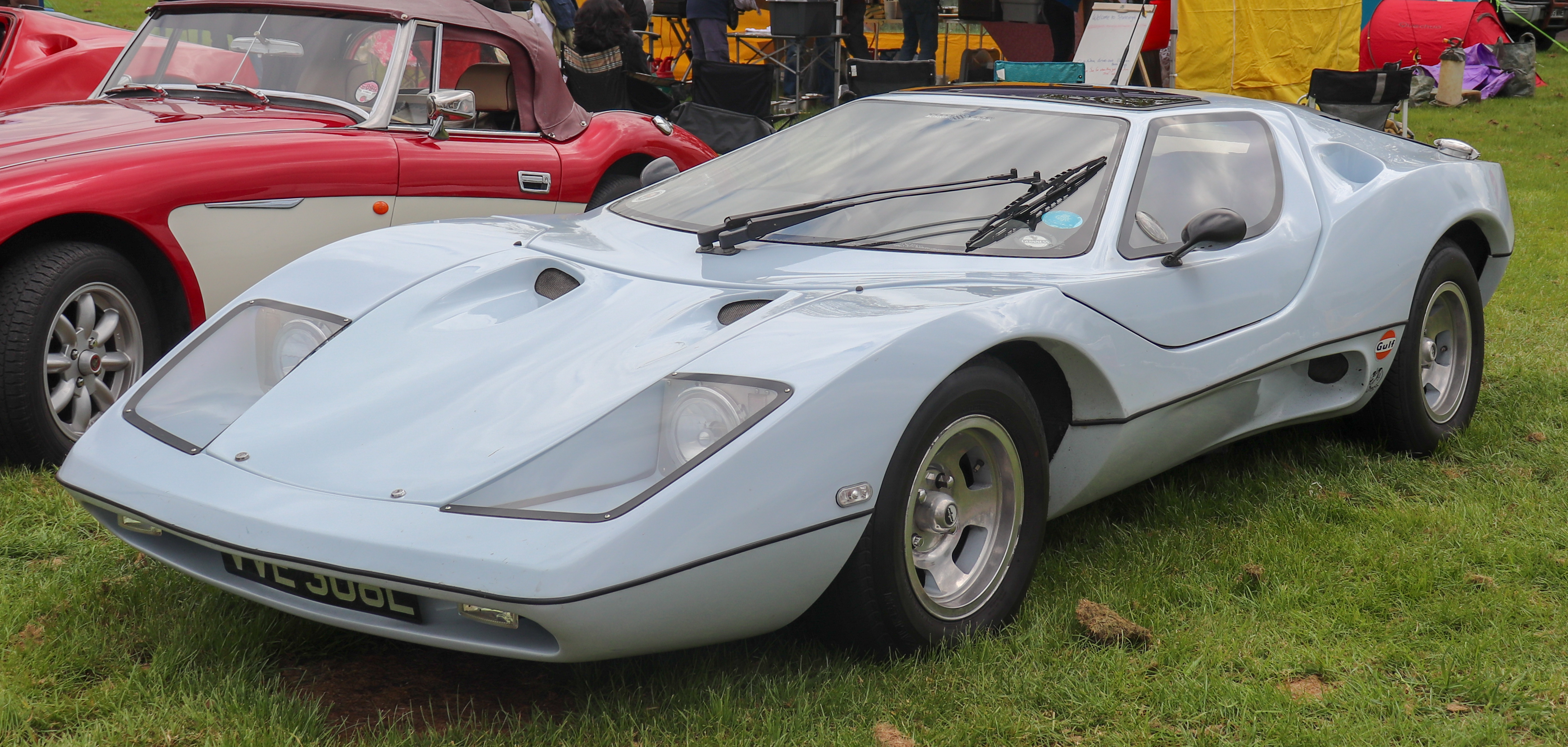
ADD Nova at a car meet

Automotive Design and Development Ltd (ADD) was an English company responsible for the creation of the futuristic-looking Nova kit car. It was based in Southampton from 1971 to 1973 after which it moved to Accrington, Lancashire until 1975. ADD failed and the rights to the Nova were bought by Nova Cars in Mirfield, West Yorkshire in 1978, which continued until 1990. A low volume production run was made by Nova Developments in Cornwall in the 1990s and the company was sold to India-based Aerotec Nova around 1996.

== Nova ==
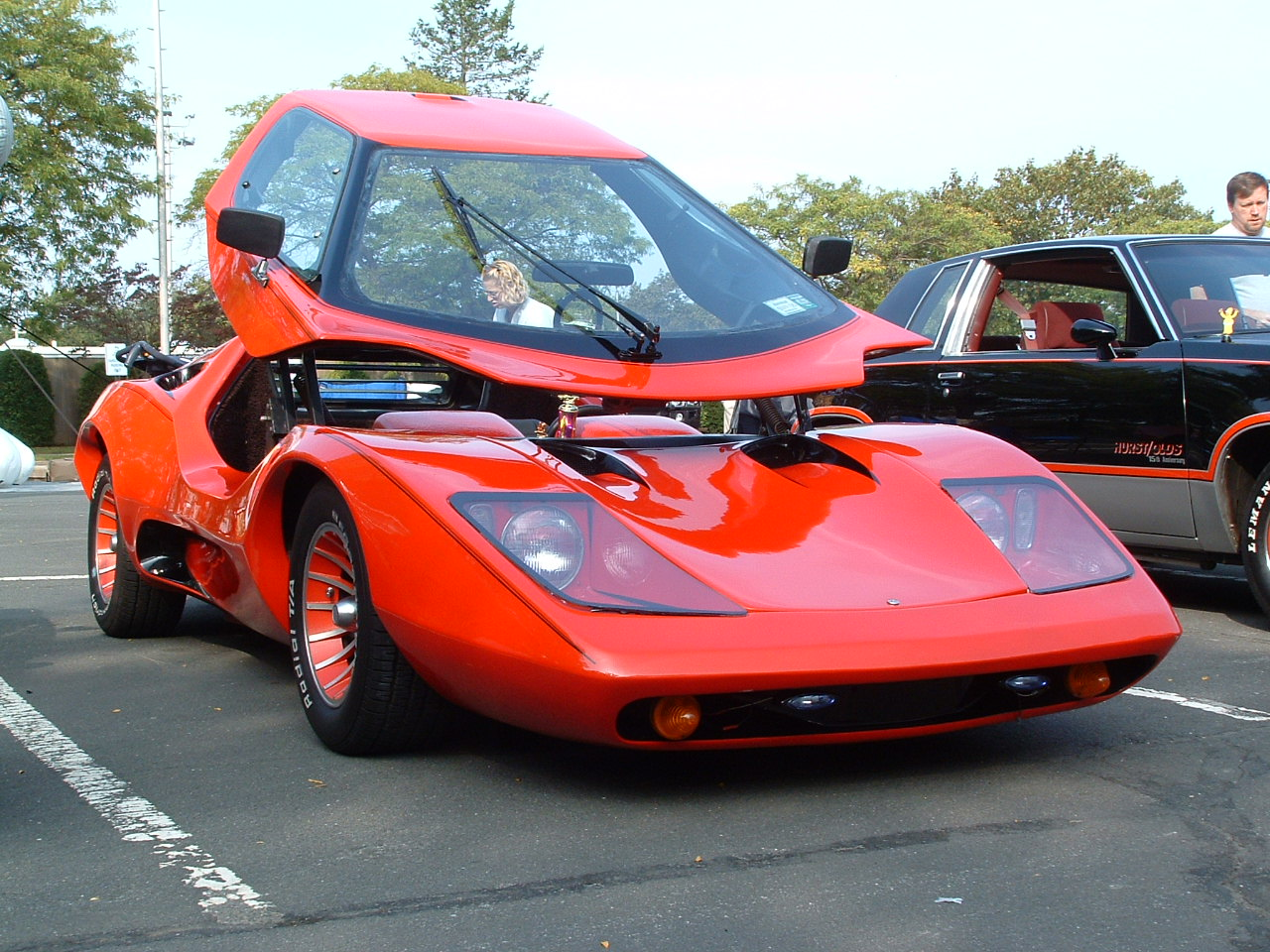
Sterling Nova with canopy opened

The car was styled by Richard Oakes with engineering by Phil Sayers, combining a fibreglass shell on a VW Beetle chassis and mechanicals. A two-seater, it was highlighted by a dramatically opening canopy that combined roof and doors into one.

Licensed versions of the Nova have been built in Austria as the Ledl, in Australia as the Purvis Eureka, in France as the Défi, in Italy as the Totem and Puma, in New Zealand as the Scorpion, in South Africa as the Eagle, in Switzerland as the Gryff, in the United States as the Sterling and Sovran and in Zimbabwe as the Tarantula. There have also been numerous unlicensed copies. Some versions featured pop-up head lamps and gull-wing doors, but the basic silhouette remained the same.

Versions of the Nova have appeared in a number of films, including Cannonball Run II, Death Race 2000, Winners and Sinners, Condorman and Mani Di Velluto.

== See also ==
- Canopy door
- Purvis Eureka
- KTM X-Bow GTX
- List of car manufacturers of the United Kingdom
