= Puma (village) =

- Village
- Location within Solomon Islands
- Coordinates: 11°36′47.9″S 166°58′9.8″E

Puma is the only inhabited village of the island of Teanu, in the Vanikoro group located in the Solomon Islands.

The language spoken there has been sometimes referred to as Puma (or wrongly Buma), and is now known as Teanu.
