= Puma (kit car company) =

Automobile manufacturer in Italy

Puma was an Italian automobile company which specialized in kit cars and was active from the 1970s to 1990s. Its headquarters were in Via Tiburtina, Rome.

The company's models ranging from off-road vehicles such as dune buggies to sports cars and limited edition, reworked Volkswagen Beetles, redesigned aesthetically and tuned for performance. The first model was the Gatto Spider Spiaggia, a design which emerged from the company's experience in modifying Deserter Dune Buggies.

Puma was founded by businessman Adriano Gatto. Another key figure in the company was Domenico Lombardi, who was originally a technician; his role at Puma included overseeing the development of all models produced by the company.

== Models ==
Seven models were designed by Gatto and Lombardi.

=== Gatto Spider Spiaggia ===
A classic dune buggy built over a VW chassis on which was mounted Volkswagen 1192 cc air-cooled engine, with a body made up of fiberglass panels. It was a big commercial success due to quality and affordable price for the kit.

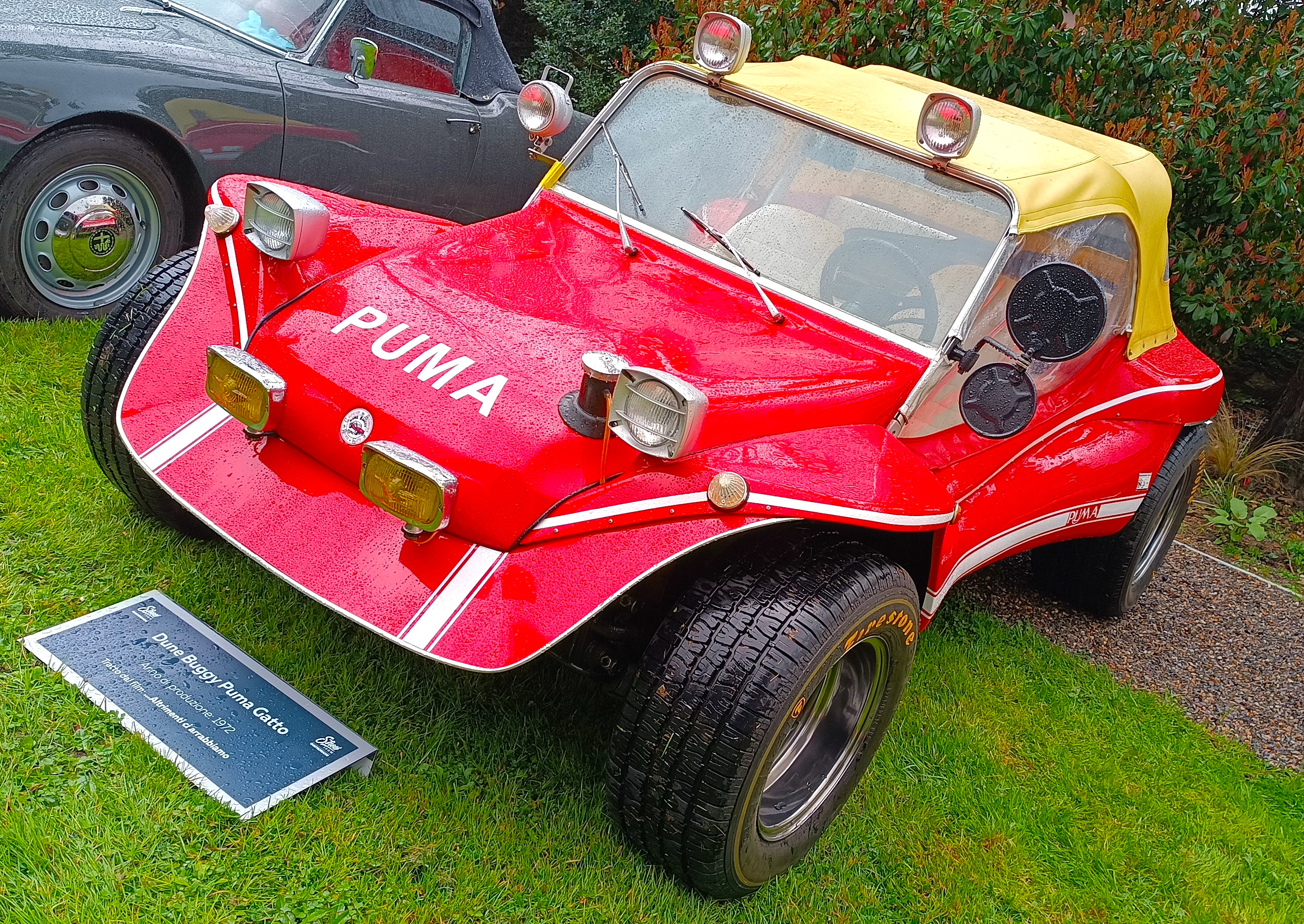
1972 Gatto Spider Spiaggia

=== Puma (1973) ===
This car was an evolution of Gatto Spider Spiaggia, built over a shortened Volkswagen chassis powered by the same 1192 cc engine. Different versions were available, and GT trim level included a much more aggressive body and an optional hard top fitted with gull-wing doors, which made this car enjoyable all year round. The Puma GT was sold through Puma Marketing Company and for a short time C.B Performance.

=== Puma GTV (1979) ===
GTV was the Italian version of Nova Eagle build under license from the UK company Nova. Car design was from Richard Oakes and it featured a very particular cockpit opening: windshield and roof were hinged near the hood and tilted forward to give easier access. This car also used Volkswagen chassis and Volkswagen engine, built up to 1385 cc by Lombardi in order to achieve higher performance.

=== Puma Ranch ===
An "Jeep Wrangler-inspired" off-road vehicle with a diametrically opposite technical approach, as the engine was in the rear and trunk in front. The chassis was an original idea of Lombardi, powered by the usual German engine now with 1385 cc. Customers could request a 1.6-liter version and the body was still in fiberglass. At that time, the Ranch was the only off-road vehicle produced in Italy.

=== Puma GTV-033 (1984) and GTV-033.S ===
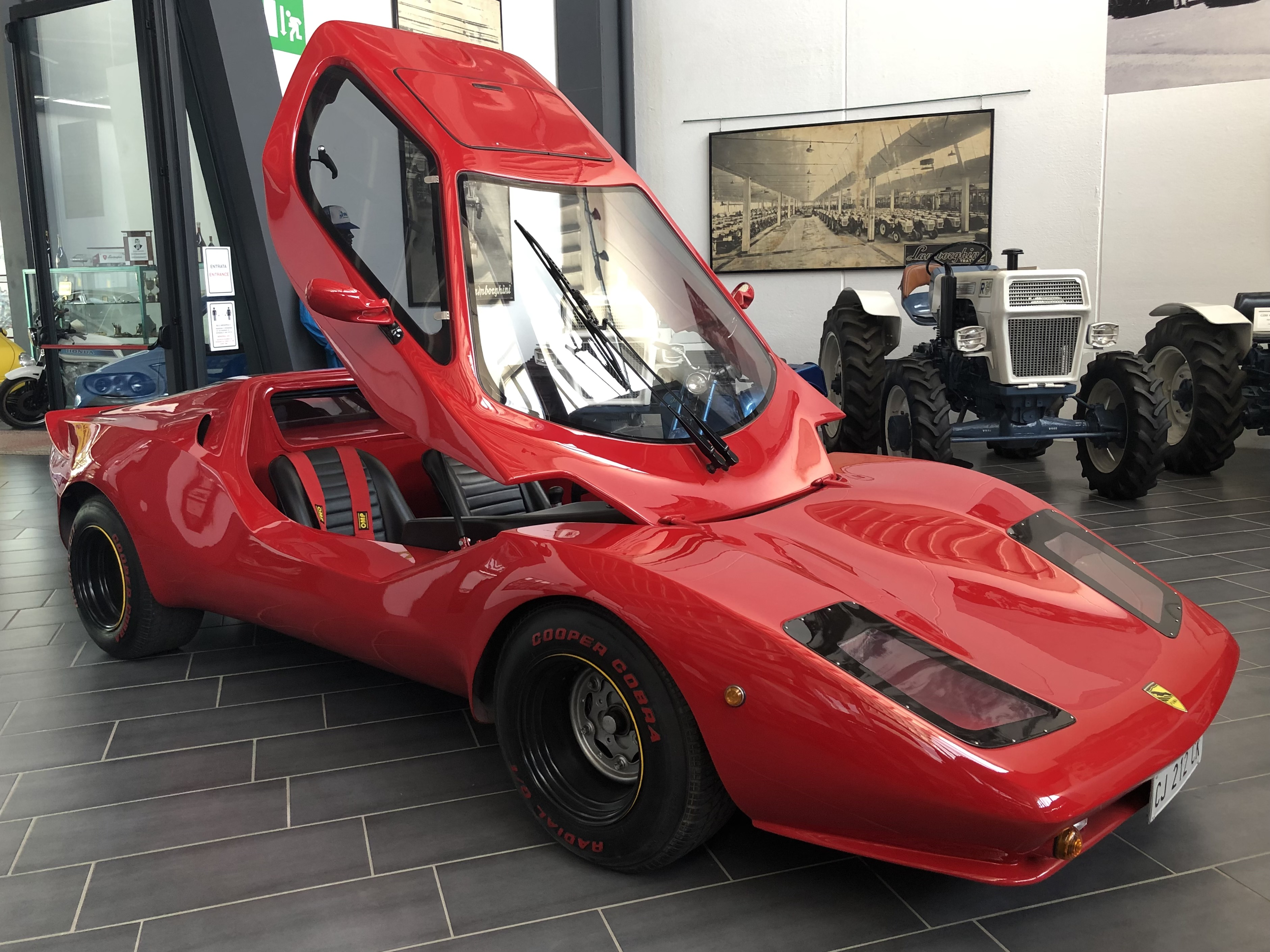
1984 Puma GTV-033 at the Museo Ferruccio Lamborghini

The GTV second series is characterized by a different body and a new engine. The snout was shorter than in the first series, the back is more square and the sides are not rounded at the bottom, recalling the skirts of racing cars of that period. This harsher body line was not warmly welcomed by the public, who still preferred the curved lines of the first series. It was decided to use a longer snout and rectangular headlights to try to get closer to the original style of the GTV. This rebodied "-033" was named "-033.S". The car was powered by a water-cooled 1186 cc 4-cylinder boxer Alfa Romeo engine replacing the older air-cooled Volkswagen engine. With its higher power output it gave the car more brilliant performances . The second series remained in production until 1991 when the third series was launched.

=== Puma Boxer 90 (1991) ===
By now the sinuous lines of the original GTV are gone and the complex cockpit opening system with them, replaced by two gull-wing doors, a still unusual solution. The body was still aggressive and the interiors were more cared. This more complex building technique forced many buyers to choose it already assembled, rather than assembling it by themselves. It was equipped with a 1490 cc Alfa Romeo boxer engine, so performances were increased.

== Out of business ==
Built as a prototype in 1993, Puma 248 was to be the Puma Boxer 90 heir. This car had a new frame design and leather interior improvement. The history of Puma ends here, because in the same year a fire destroyed the plant and also the prototype. Adriano Gatto decided not to resume the activity because Italian law became more restrictive towards kit cars, effectively blocking the activity of small manufacturers who could not afford the huge cost required for the homologation procedures of their models. After this, the aficionados gathered in various clubs. In Italy, Puma Club Italy and Puma Club Monza are two of the larger clubs.
