= Banie (island) =

Island in Temotu, Solomon Islands

Coordinates: 11°39′S 166°54′E

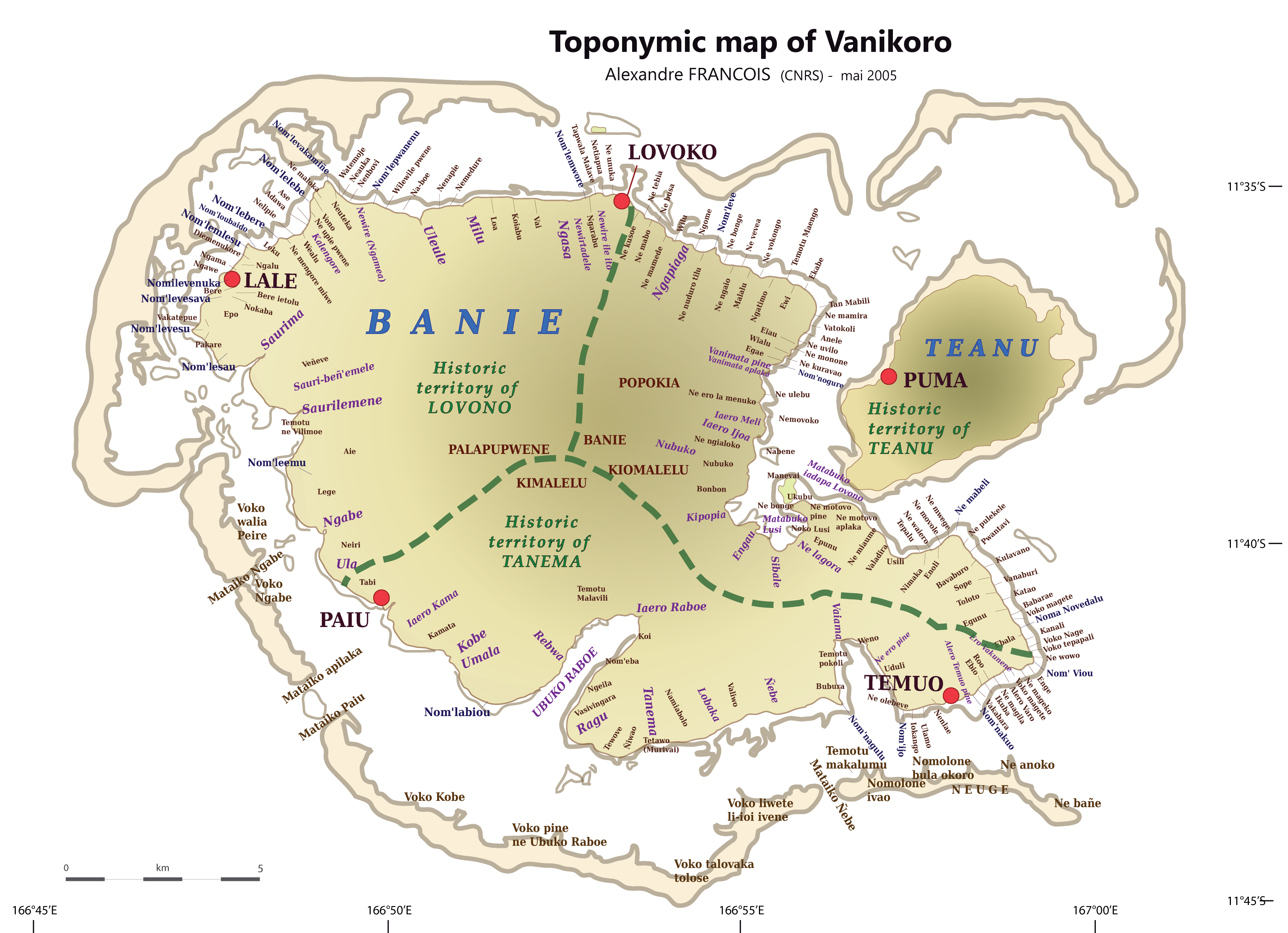
Toponymic map of Vanikoro I., showing the main islands Banie and Teanu.

Banie (Teanu pronunciation: [ᵐbanie]) is the main island of the Vanikoro group, in the Temotu province of Solomon Islands. The only other inhabited island of the group is the smaller island of Teanu or Tevai.

== Name ==
The island of Banie receives its name from its highest mountain, mount Banie.

The local population sometimes uses Banie as a way to designate the whole Vanikoro group.
