= Teanu (island) =

Island in Solomon Islands

Coordinates: 11°38′S 166°58′E

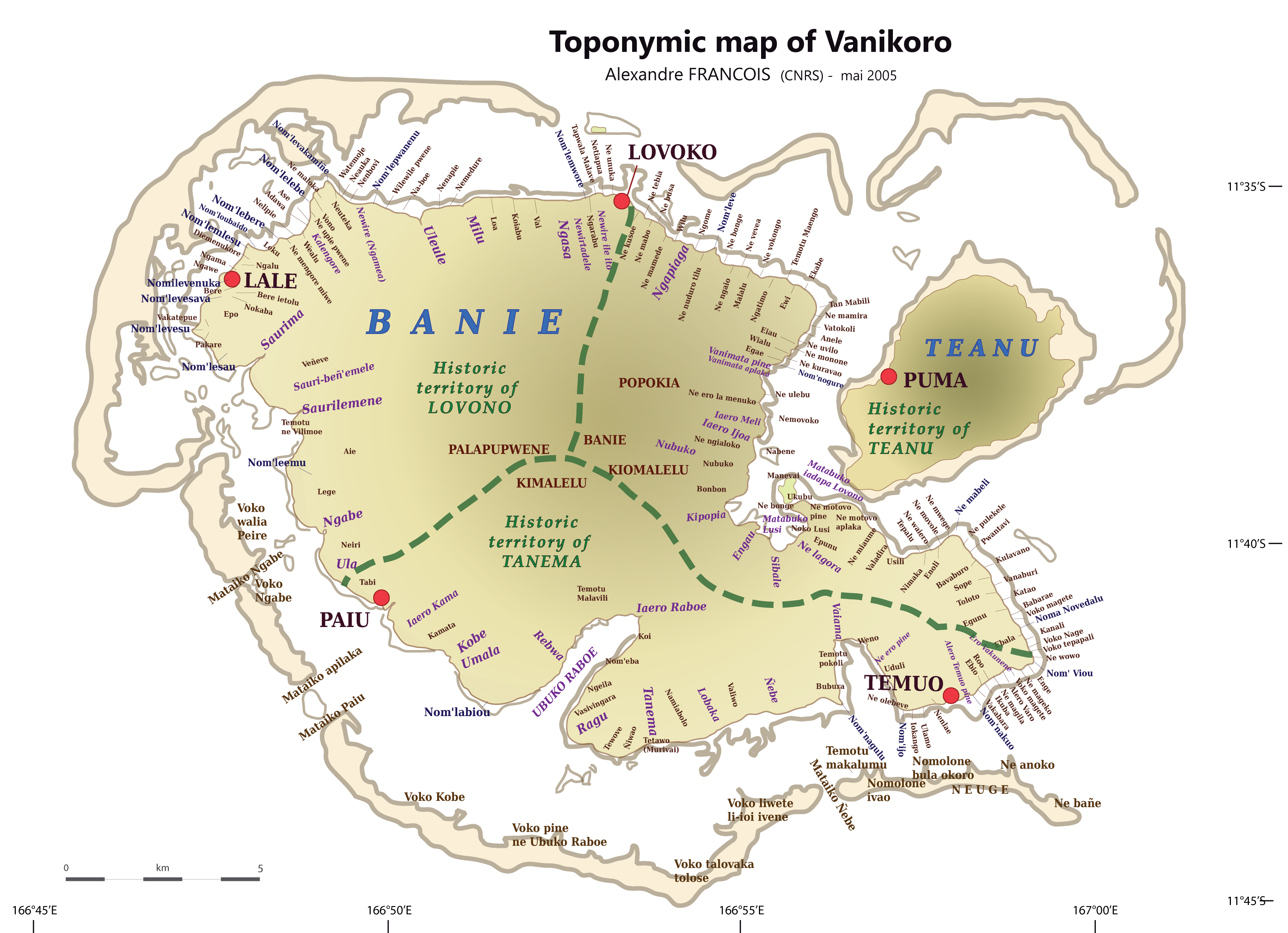
Toponymic map of Vanikoro I., showing the main islands Banie and Teanu.

Teanu (or Tevai) is the second largest island of the Vanikoro group, in Temotu Province, Solomon Islands. It is located northeast of the main island of the group, Banie.

== Population ==
Teanu has currently only one inhabited village, Puma.

Teanu has given its name to Teanu, the main language of Vanikoro. The latter is sometimes known also as Puma.

== In popular culture ==
The latitude and longitude coordinates of the virtual cycling world of Watopia on the Zwift cycling platform coincide with this island, and websites such as Strava therefore show Zwift rides overlain on a map of Teanu even though Teanu has no roads and rides seem to frequently cross between water and land.
