= Tikopia language =

Polynesian language

Coordinates: 12.3°S 168.83°E

Tikopia
- Native to: Solomon Islands
- Region: Tikopia
- Native speakers: (3,300 cited 1999)
- Language family: Austronesian: Malayo-Polynesian; Oceanic; Polynesian; Ellicean–Eastern; Tikopia

Language codes
- ISO 639-3: tkp
- Glottolog: tiko1237

The Tikopia language, or Fakatikopia, is a Polynesian Outlier language from the island of Tikopia in the Solomon Islands. It is closely related to the Anuta language of the neighboring island of Anuta; some linguists believe they are dialects of the same language.

The language is spoken by approximately 3,320 speakers, and is not considered endangered.

Tikopia was thorough described by anthropologist Raymond Firth (1901-2002).

== History ==
Because of its remote and isolated location, Tikopia had little contact with outsiders until well into the twentieth century. One exception is the Melanesian population of Vanikoro, with whom Tikopia islanders have been in regular contact for several centuries.

Tikopians occasionally visited other islands, but these trips were limited by the large distances and great hazards involved in making the journey using canoes. Contact with Westerners began sporadically around the beginning of the nineteenth century; in 1927, when Raymond Firth did his initial fieldwork in Tikopia, the indigenous culture was largely intact. The major groups to contact Tikopians were missionaries and labor recruiters. By the 1950s, all the Tikopians had become Christianized, and most of the native ritual practices had ceased. Much of the Tikopian life style has remained intact, although Westernization has occurred.

Nowadays, besides the population living on Tikopia island, the language is also spoken by the Polynesian minority on Vanikoro, who migrated from Tikopia several centuries ago. It is also practised by resettled outlying communities across the Solomon Islands following re-settlement schemes of the 1950's-1960's, like in the communities of Nukufero on Pavuvu, as well as in Nukukaisi on Makira island though to a lesser extent than Nukufero.

== Phonology ==
=== Consonants ===
Tikopia has eleven consonant phonemes. They are written ⟨f, k, l, m, n, p, r, s, t, v, w, ng⟩.

Consonants
	Labial	Dental/ Alveolar	Velar
Nasal	m	n	ŋ
Plosive	p	t̪	k
Fricative	f v	s	
Trill		r	
Lateral		l̪	

- /p, t̪, k/ are aspirated ([pʰ], [t̪ʰ], [kʰ]) before /u/.
- /v/ is [w] medially before /u/.

It is debated whether or not Tikopia uses ⟨l⟩ or ⟨r⟩. Samuel Elbert claimed /l/ was used but not /r/. Raymond Firth said, "Dumont D'Urville published a small dictionary in 1834 where 235 words were collected." ⟨R⟩ appeared in 50 words while ⟨l⟩ appeared in only 15. The language changed in over a century and modernly more words are used with ⟨l⟩. Raymond Firth's own work shows that both ⟨l⟩ and ⟨r⟩ phonemes are used, but that words with ⟨l⟩ are far less common.

=== Vowels ===
Vowels
	Front	Central	Back
Close	i		u
Mid	e		o
Open		a	

- /e/ shows free variation between [e] and [ɛ], e.g., /peti/ [ˈpeti ~ ˈpɛti] 'fat'.
- /o/ shows free variation between [o] and [ɔ], e.g., /foŋa/ [ˈfoŋa ~ ˈfɔŋa] 'above'.
- /a/ shows free variation between [a] and [ʌ], e.g., /muna/ [ˈmuna ~ ˈmunʌ] 'speak'.

Dodenhoff (1982) did not find contrastive vowel length, but notes that W. J. Durrad found two examples and Raymond Firth found one. This vowel length can be transcribed by doubling the vowel, or with a macron on the vowel.

== Orthography ==
This orthography is used by Dodenhoff:

Phoneme	Allophones	Orthography
/m/	[m]	m
/n/	[n]	n
/ŋ/	[ŋ]	ng
/l/	[l]	l
/r/	[r]	r
/f/	[f]	f
/v/	[v], [w]	v
/s/	[s]	s
/i/	[i]	i
/e/	[e], [ɛ]	e
/a/	[a], [ʌ]	a
/o/	[o], [ɔ]	o
/u/	[u]	u

== Grammar ==
=== Basic word order ===
The basic word order in Tikopia is subject-verb-object, but sometimes verb-subject-object is used.

=== Reduplication ===
Tikopia uses partial reduplication, usually to encode plurality on the verb.

== Vocabulary ==
=== Loanwords ===
The main sources of loanwords are from Anuta, Mota, Hawaiian, and English.

- pakutini - "pumpkin"
- atamole - "watermelon"
- rais - "rice"
- pīni - "beans"
- poi - "tinned Meat"
- piksha - "picture"
- kastom - "custom"
- leta - "letter"

== Materials in the language ==
Most of the recorded documents on this language come from the linguist Raymond Firth; Tikopia did not have much documentation until this time. In 1928 Firth stayed for a year; he revisited in 1952 for five more months and again in 1966. Only one person, Reverend W. J. Durrad in 1910 who stayed for a duration of 2 months, had recorded documents before.

Raymond Firth created a dictionary for the Tikopian language. Other materials in the language include: a translation of the Bible; a few YouTube videos; some song books. Linguist A. François has also made a handful of audio recordings while doing fieldwork with the Tikopian community of Vanikoro.

== References and links ==
=== References ===
- Dillon, Peter (1830). Voyage aux îles de la mer du Sud, en 1827 et 1828, et Relation de la découverte du sort de La Pérouse. Par le Capitaine Peter Dillon. Paris: Pillet Aîné.
- Dodenhoff, Daniel D. (1982). "A Tikopia phonology". In Lynch, J.; Dodenhoff, D. (eds.). Papers in Linguistics of Melanesia No. 4. Canberra: Research School of Pacific and Asian Studies, Australian National University. doi:10.15144/PL-A64.155.
- Firth, Raymond (1961). History and Traditions of Tikopia. Wellington: The Polynesian Society.
- —— (1963). "L and R in Tikopia Language". Oceanic Linguistics. 2 (2): 49–61. JSTOR 20172291.
- —— (1996). "Tikopia". Encyclopedia of World Cultures – via Encyclopedia.com.
- Monberg, Torben (1971). "Tikopia Color Classification". Ethnology. 10 (3): 349–358. doi:10.2307/3772921. JSTOR 3772921.

=== External links ===
- Te Rotu Te Kau Kava Tapu Anglican Holy Communion in Tikopia
- Paradisec has two collections of Arthur Capell's materials (AC1, AC2) that include Tikopia language materials.
- "The story of Lapérouse": Audio recording in the Tikopia language, recorded and annotated by linguist A. François, in open access (Pangloss Collection of CNRS, Paris).
