= Puma (web server) =

- Original author(s): Evan Phoenix
- Initial release: 2011
- Stable release: 6.6.0 / 28 January 2025; 58 days ago
- Repository: github.com/puma/puma
- Written in: Ruby, C
- Operating system: Cross-platform
- Available in: English
- Type: Web server
- License: BSD 3-Clause
- Website: puma.io

Puma is an HTTP web server derived from Mongrel and written by Evan Phoenix. It stresses speed and efficient use of memory.

== Reception and use ==
Puma is the web server shipped with Mastodon and recommended by the Heroku hosting provider as a replacement for Unicorn.

Deliveroo published a benchmark comparing the two servers and concluded “Puma performs better than Unicorn in all tests that were either heavily IO-bound or that interleaved IO and CPU work”, but that Unicorn was still slightly better performing in situations where CPU load was the limiting factor.
