= Teanu language =

Oceanic language spoken in the Solomon Islands

Teanu
- Buma, Puma
- Native to: Solomon Islands
- Region: Vanikoro, Eastern Solomons
- Native speakers: 800 (2012)
- Language family: Austronesian: Malayo-Polynesian; Oceanic; Temotu; Vanikoro; Teanu

Language codes
- ISO 639-3: tkw
- Glottolog: tean1237
- ELP: Teanu
- Teanu is classified as Definitely Endangered by the UNESCO Atlas of the World's Languages in Danger.
- Coordinates: 11°39′S 166°54′E

Teanu (or Puma, Buma) is the main language spoken on the island of Vanikoro, in the easternmost province of the Solomon Islands.

== Name ==
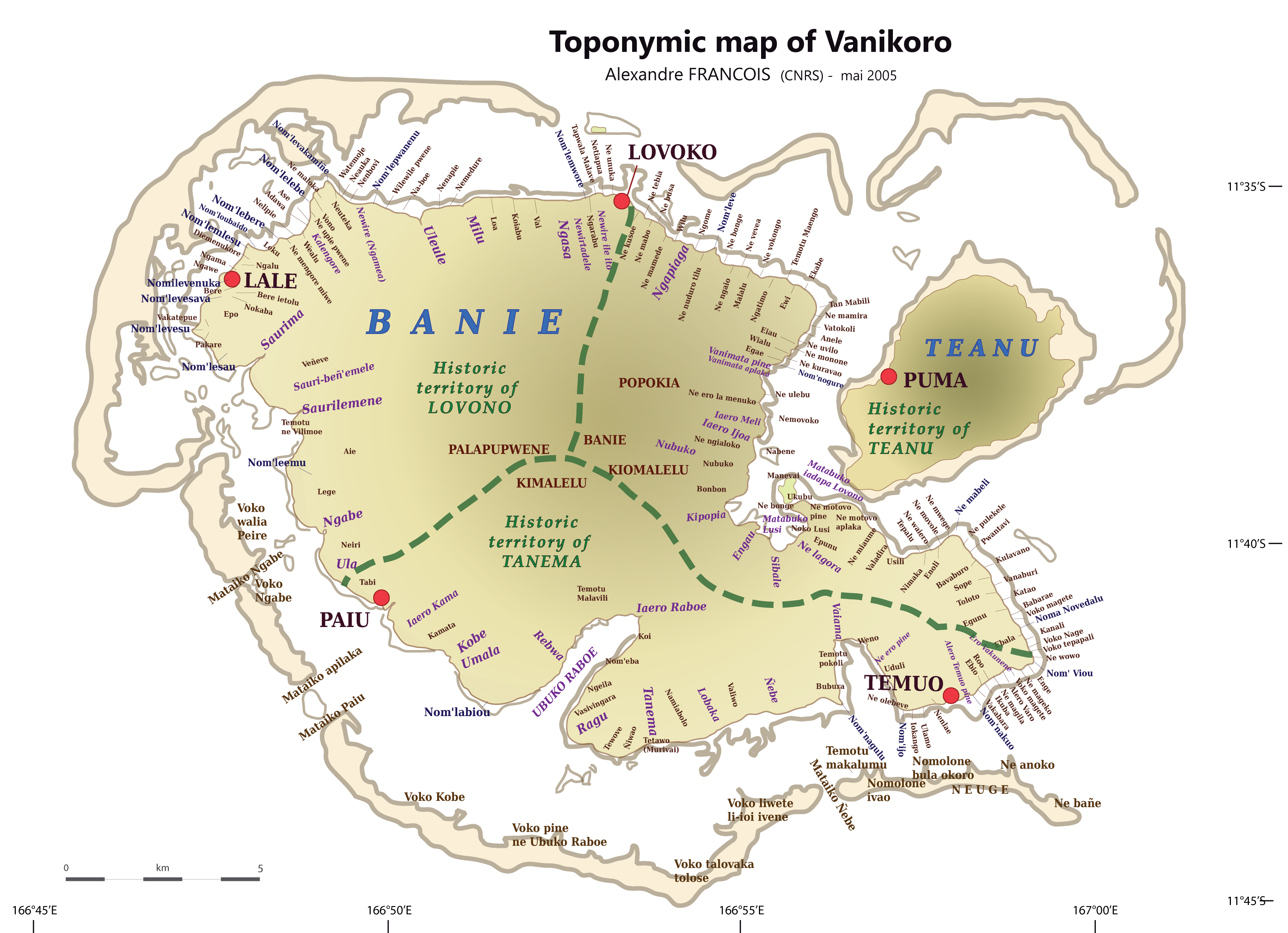
Map of Vanikoro I., showing the historical territories of the three tribes of Lovono, Tanema and Teanu

The language receives its name from Teanu, the island located northeast of the Vanikoro island group. The same language has also been known in the literature as Puma (or wrongly Buma), after the main village of Teanu island.

== Sources ==
The very first source about the languages of Vanikoro were wordlists collected in 1834 by French naturalist Joseph Paul Gaimard, as he took part in the first voyage of Astrolabe (1826–36) led by Dumont d'Urville. On top of his botanical and zoological work, Gaimard collected, and later published, about ten pages of wordlists in Teanu, Tanema and Lovono. In this work, the three languages were labelled respectively "Tanéanou", "Tanema", and "Vanikoro".

More data was collected in the 1980s by Australian linguist Darrell Tryon; he described Teanu using the name "Buma".

The languages of Vanikoro are currently being studied by French linguist Alexandre François.

== Geographical distribution ==
Whereas Teanu used to be confined to the northeast part of the island group, during the 20th century it became the main language of the whole island group of Vanikoro, at the expense of the two other indigenous languages Lovono and Tanema.

While the Melanesian population of Vanikoro now speaks Teanu, the southern coast of the island also has been colonised for a few centuries by a Polynesian population, who still keep strong ties with their homeland, the nearby island of Tikopia. Their main language is Tikopia, even though some speak Teanu as a second language.

== Phonology ==
The phoneme inventory of Teanu includes 19 consonants and 5 vowels.

=== Consonants ===
		Labio- velarized	Labial	Alveolar	Palatal	Velar
Plosive	voiceless	pʷ	p	t		k
Plosive	prenasal	ᵐbʷ	ᵐb	ⁿd	ᶮɟ	ᵑɡ
Nasal		mʷ	m	n	ɲ	ŋ
Fricative			v	s		
Liquid	lateral			l		
Liquid	trill			r		
Approximant		w				

The labiodental fricative /v/ can be freely devoiced [f], especially word-initially. By contrast, the phoneme /s/ is always heard voiceless.

Teanu does not have a phonemic palatal glide /j/: the sound [j] only exists as an allophone of /i/ before another vowel: e.g. iebe [i.e.ᵐbe] ~ [je.ᵐbe] ‘besom, broom’.

=== Vowels ===
Teanu has 5 phonemic vowels, /i e a o u/.

	Front	Back
Close	i	u
Close-mid	e	o
Open	a	

Tryon (2002) proposed that vowel length may be contrastive, but more recent research has found this to be incorrect: the language only has five short vowels (François 2009:107).
