= Vanikoro =

Island in Solomon Islands

Coordinates: 11°39′S 166°54′E

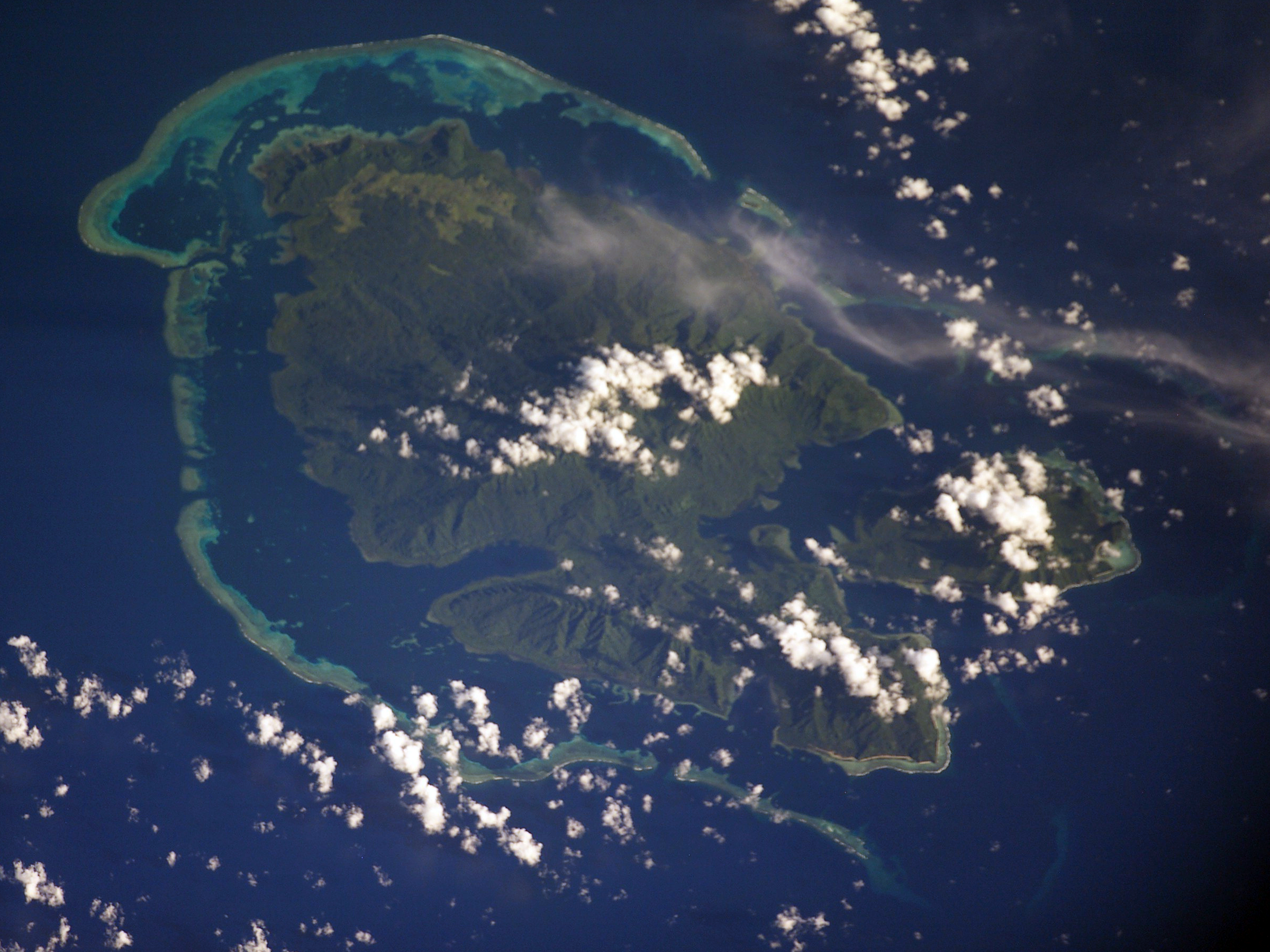
- Vanikoro from space. Courtesy NASA

- Location within Solomon Islands

Geography
- Archipelago: Santa Cruz Islands
- Area: 173 km^{2} (67 sq mi)

Administration
- Solomon Islands
- Province: Temotu

Demographics
- Population: 1293 (2009)
- Ethnic groups: Melanesian, Polynesian

Vanikoro (sometimes wrongly named Vanikolo) is an island in the Santa Cruz group, located 118 kilometres (73 miles) to the Southeast of the main Santa Cruz group. It is part of the Temotu Province of Solomon Islands.

The name Vanikoro is always used as though it referred to a single island, due to both its geophysical and cultural unity. However, technically it is a group of several nearby islands surrounded by a single belt of coral reef. Only the two major islands are inhabited: the bigger one Banie, and the smaller one Teanu (or Tevai). Other, uninhabited islets in the Vanikoro group include Manieve, Nomianu and Nanunga. The total area of the Vanikoro group is 173 square kilometres (66.8 square miles).

== Population and languages ==
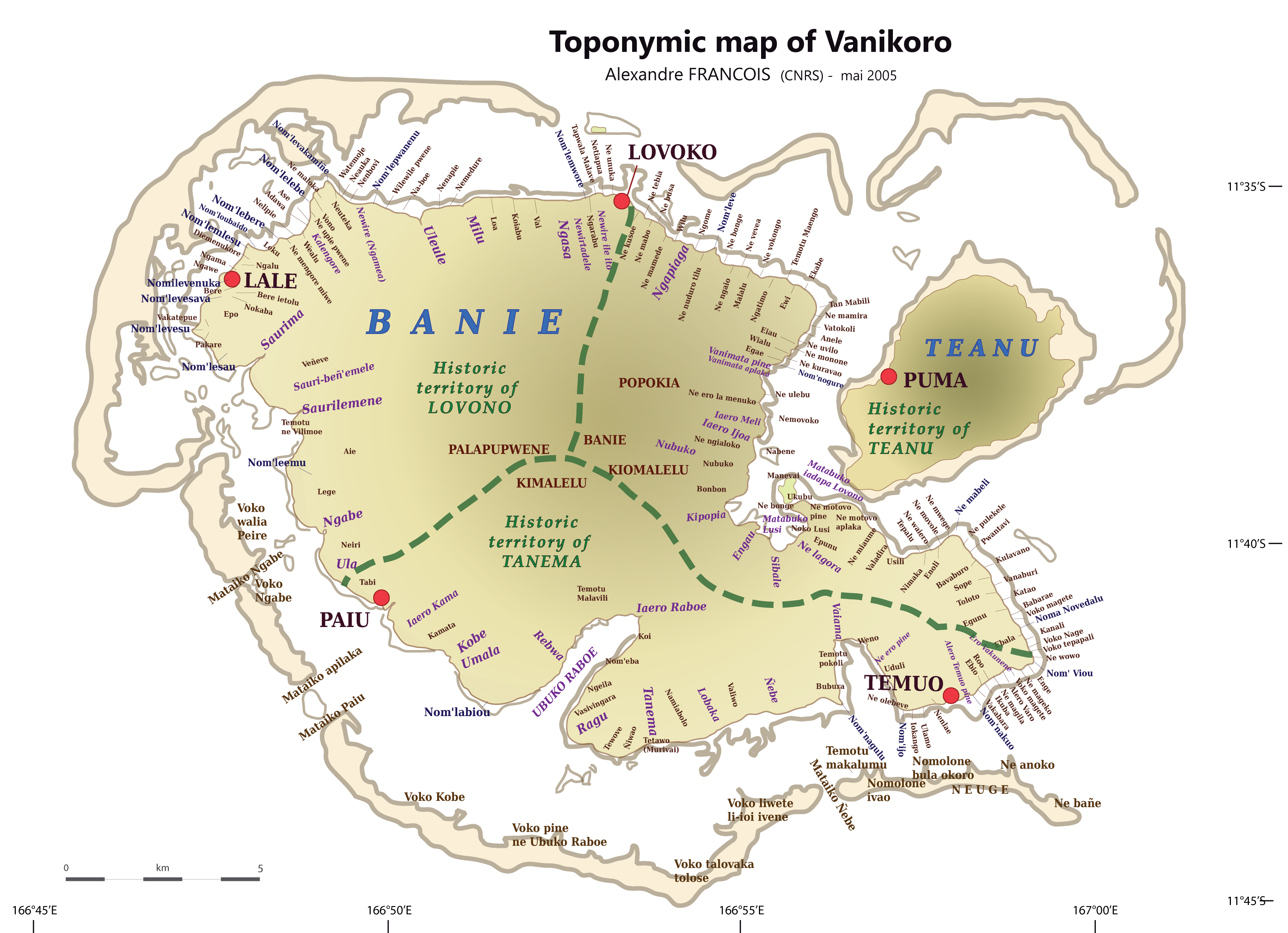
Detailed toponymic map of Vanikoro I., showing the historical territories of the three tribes of Lovono, Tanema and Teanu.

The 1,293 inhabitants of Vanikoro consist of two different populations, who tend to live separately.

The Melanesian majority, about 800 people, are the descendants of the original population of Vanikoro. They have been present on the island since Lapita times, approximately 1200 BCE.

A minority of about 500 individuals are of Polynesian descent: they have migrated from the island of Tikopia, an island lying 200 kilometres (124 miles) eastwards, which they identify as their origin. They established their first settlements on Vanikoro about 400 years ago on the southern coast of Banie. In 1893, many Tikopians returned to Tikopia as a result of the Solomon Islands having been declared a British protectorate., but several Tikopians returned to Vanikoro in the 1900s. The two major villages are Murivai and Taumako Bay.

The three languages spoken by the Melanesian population of Vanikoro are all Oceanic, of the Temotu subgroup:

- Teanu or Buma (800 speakers)
- Lovono or Vano (4 speakers)
- Tanema (1 speaker)

The Tikopian settlers speak a Polynesian language, Tikopian or fakatikopia.

== History ==
Vanikoro men - 1895

The first sighting of Vanikoro by Europeans was in September 1595, by the second Spanish expedition of Álvaro de Mendaña. It was sighted by Lorenzo Barreto, while in command of one of the smaller vessels on a voyage around the then Santa Cruz, which is today's Nendo Island.

The French explorer Jean-François de La Pérouse was stranded on Vanikoro after both his vessels, Boussole and the Astrolabe, struck the then unknown reefs of the island in 1788. It is reported that some of the men were killed by the local inhabitants, while the surviving sailors built a smaller vessel and left the island, but were never seen again. Those that remained on the island died before search parties arrived in 1826. Jules Verne dedicates a chapter of his novel Twenty Thousand Leagues Under the Seas to this event. Author Naomi Williams' novel Landfalls explores the Lapérouse expedition in depth.

Chapter 1, Coral Sea, of James Michener's novel, Tales of the South Pacific, is set on the island of Vanicoro.

== Environment ==
Vanikoro is largely forested, with an annual rainfall of 5,000 mm (200 inches). Most of its human population is engaged in subsistence farming and fishing. It has been identified by BirdLife International as an Important Bird Area (IBA) because it supports populations of endemic Vanikoro monarchs and Vanikoro white-eyes, as well as of red-bellied fruit doves, pied goshawks, palm lorikeets, cardinal myzomelas, Polynesian trillers and rusty-winged starlings. The Vanikoro flying fox is endemic to the island. Saltwater crocodiles are present in the island's mangroves, as they are on all of the major islands of Temotu Province. The island represents the easternmost range of the species within the Solomon Islands (and the second easternmost population overall, behind only Vanua Lava in Vanuatu, which may no longer have a breeding population).
