= Malo =

Mal, which in Spanish means bad or evil, may also refer to:

== Places ==
- Malo, Italy, a town
- Malo Island, formerly known as St. Bartholomew, Vanuatu
- Malo (Solomon Islands), an island
- Malo, Washington, Ferry County, Washington, United States
- Malo-les-Bains, now part of Dunkirk, France
- Saint-Malo, commune and port in Brittany, France
- Saint-Malo, Quebec, Canada
- St. Malo, Manitoba, Canada

== People ==
- Malo (given name)
- Malo (surname)
- Malo (caste) (also known as Jhalo Malo)
- Malo (saint) (born c. 520), 6th century saint, founder and namesake of the Breton city
- Malo, hero-god of Torres Strait Islander people
- Malo', a French singer
- Malo-Renault (1870–1938), French pastelist, color engraver and illustrator

== Other ==
- Malo (band), American Latin-tinged rock and roll group
  - Malo (album), a 1972 album by the band
- "Malo" (song), a song by Anuel AA, Zion and Randy
- "Malo", a song by Bebe from the album Pafuera Telarañas, 2004
- "Malo", a song by Maluma from the album Malo, 2012
- Malo (cnidarian), a genus of box jellyfish
- Malo, a loincloth
- Malo language (disambiguation)
- Malo (character), fictional character in game The Legend of Zelda: Twilight Princess
- Malo de Vigny, a fictional character in the game Amnesia: The Dark Descent
- Malo (company), an Italian brand of cashmere
- Government of Samoa

== See also ==
- Saint Malo (disambiguation)
- O le Ao o le Malo is the official title of Samoa's head of state
- Los Hombres Malo is an album by the band Outlaws
