= Malo (surname) =

Malo or Maló is the surname of the following notable people:

- Alberto Malo (born 1964), Spanish rugby union player
- Carlos Malo (born 1983), Uruguayan singer
- Carmen Malo (born 1972), Ecuadorian pistol shooter
- David Malo (c. 1795–1853), Native Hawaiian historian
- David Malo (footballer) (born 1980), Spanish football player
- Gina Malo (1909–1963), American film actress
- Henri Malo (1868–1948), French writer
- Ifeoma Malo, Nigerian lawyer
- Isabel Saint Malo (born 1968), Panamanian politician and diplomat
- Jean Malo-Renault (1900–1988), French librarian
- Jean Saint Malo (died 1784), American rebel slave leader
- Jonathan Malo (born 1983), Canadian baseball player
- Jorge López Malo (born 1957), Mexican football player
- Julian Malo (born 1985), Albanian football striker
- Kamou Malo (born 1963), Burkinabé football player
- Luc Malo (born 1973), Canadian politician
- María Fernanda Malo (born 1985), Mexican actress
- Nori Malo-Renault, French etcher and color printmaker
- Patrick Malo (born 1992), Burkinabé football player
- Paulo Maló, Portuguese dentist and businessman
- Raul Malo (1965–2025), American musician and producer
- René Malo (born 1942), French Canadian film producer
- Ron Malo (1935–1992), American engineer
- Samuelu Malo (born 1999), Samoan football midfielder
- Silao Malo (born 1990), Samoan football midfielder
- Vincent Malo (c.1595–1649), Flemish painter
