= Saint Malo (disambiguation) =

Saint-Malo is a port city in Brittany, France.

Saint Malo may also refer to:

- Gulf of Saint-Malo, around the city.
- Malo (saint) (born c. 520), 6th century saint, founder and namesake of the Breton city
- Saint-Malo, Quebec, a municipality in Quebec, Canada
- St. Malo, Manitoba, a town in Manitoba, Canada
- Saint Malo, Louisiana, a former village in Louisiana, USA
- MV Saint-Malo, an E-Flexer-class Ro-Pax ferry operated by Brittany Ferries

== See also ==
- Malo (disambiguation)
