= Jean Malo-Renault =

French librarian and bibliographer (1900–1988)

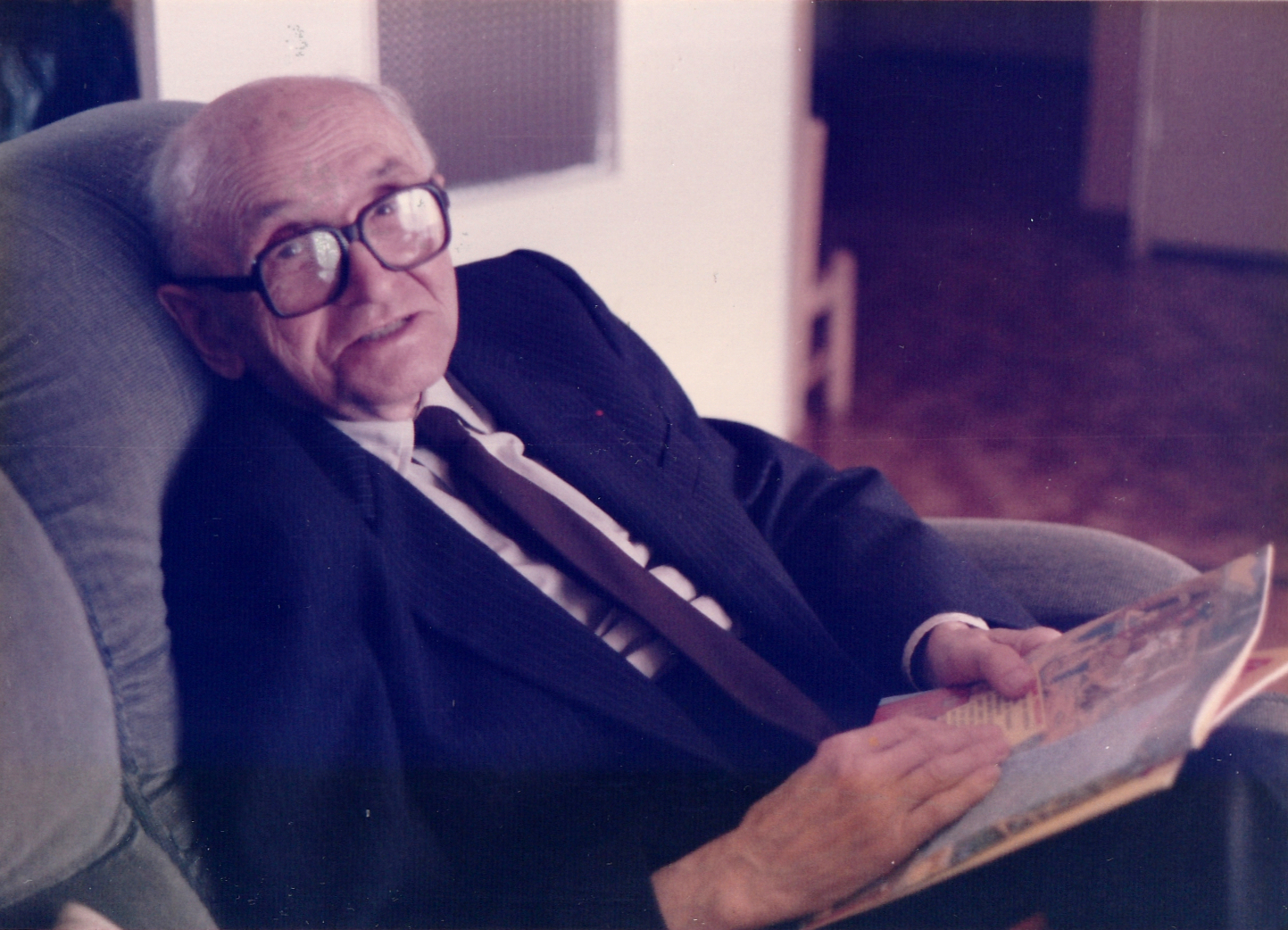
- Born: 1900 june 09; Paris (VI)
- Died: 1988 August 09; Rennes
- Education: Licence d'histoire à la Sorbonne, Paris (1924). Diplôme de l'école du Louvre, Paris (1926)
- Occupations: Curator librarian, bibliographer and French author
- Parents: Emile Malo-Renault (father); Nori Malo-Renault (mother)
- Honours: Chevalier de la légion d'honneur (1953)

Jean Malo-Renault (June 9, 1900 – August 9, 1988), was a French librarian, bibliographer, and author. He was born in Paris on 9 June 1900 into a family originating from Saint-Malo. He was the son of the pastellist, engraver and illustrator, Émile Malo-Renault, real name Émile Auguste Renault, and his wife Honorine Césarine Tian (Nori Malo-Renault), herself a printmaker, etching in color.

Jean Malo-Renault obtained his degree in history from the Sorbonne in 1924, and went on to the École du Louvre, where he wrote a thesis on religious architecture in Brittany in the Middle Ages.

From 1940 to 1944, he was part of the passive defense in Rennes. On October 16, 1944, he married Jeanne Gautier, director of the Women's Social Center of Rennes (Women's Social Center Hôtel de Blossac).

== Career ==
In 1928, he was appointed medical science subject librarian at the University of Toulouse; in 1932, he became librarian at the University of Montpellier. For a complementary thesis, he studying the letter adorned in the Middle Ages. Going on to be chief librarian of the public library of Montpellier in 1935. He returned to Brittany in 1937, and was in charge of Rennes University and Municipal Libraries until 1954. From 1955 to 1958, he was assigned to the library management of the medical and pharmacy schools of Poitiers, Limoges and Tours. then assigned to a mission in Brittany from 1958 to 1967 for the creation of the Retrospective Bibliography of Brittany (1480-1960)

Jean Malo-Renault collected a copious iconographic documentation towards a thesis on the religious architecture of Brittany. More broadly he was interested in Breton costume and popular arts.

He is known as the author of a vast retrospective bibliography of Brittany for which he analysed printed sources and periodicals from the period 1480 to 1960, 150 000 handwritten records, which is preserved in the Bibliothèque de Rennes Méropole and available on microfiche since 1987.

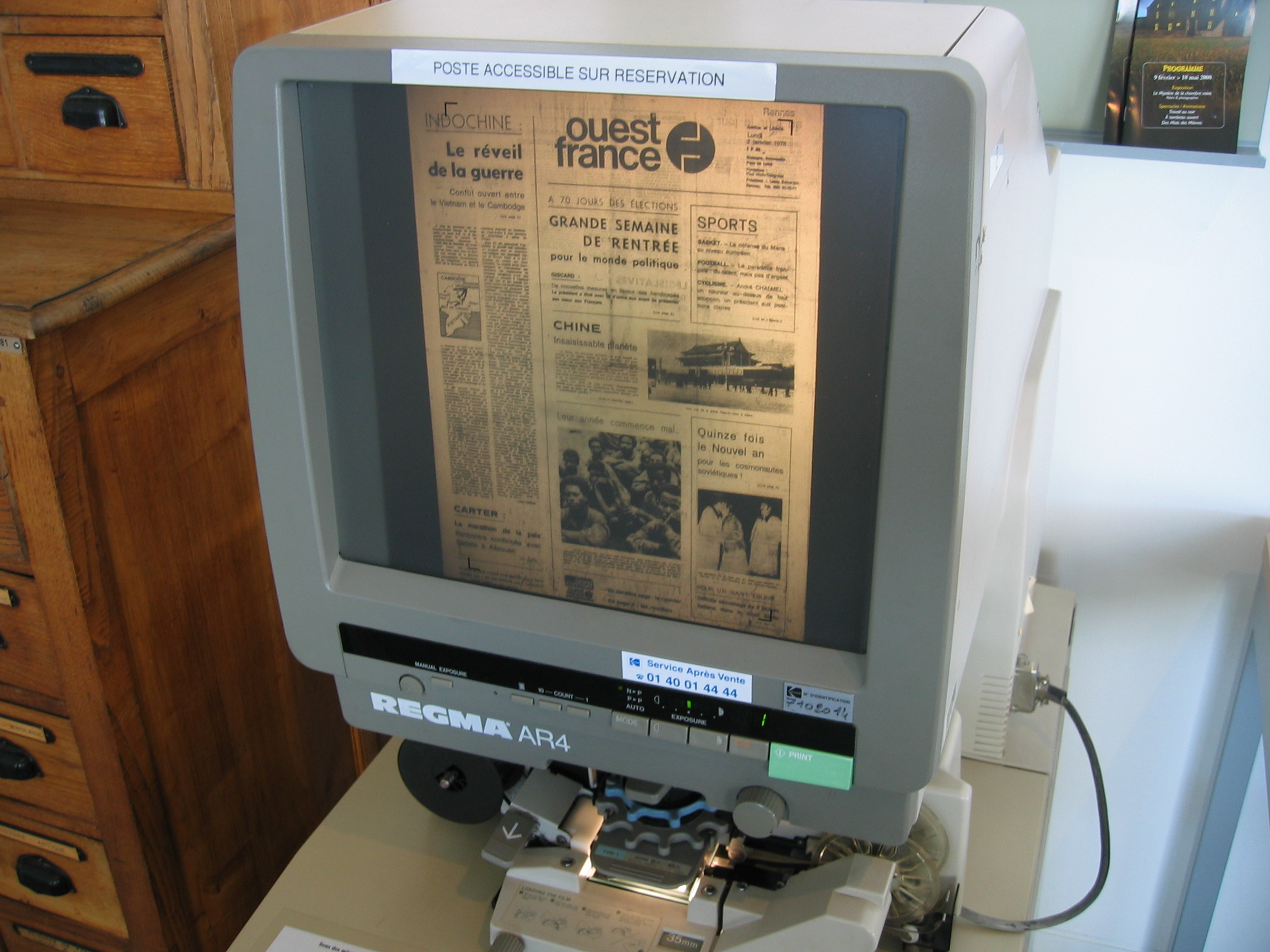
Lecteur de microfilms. Bibliothèque de Rennes métropole /Pole patrimoine.

In addition to the retrospective Bibliography of Brittany, he publishes Les pseudonymes des bretons(16th - 20th centuries) in 1987.

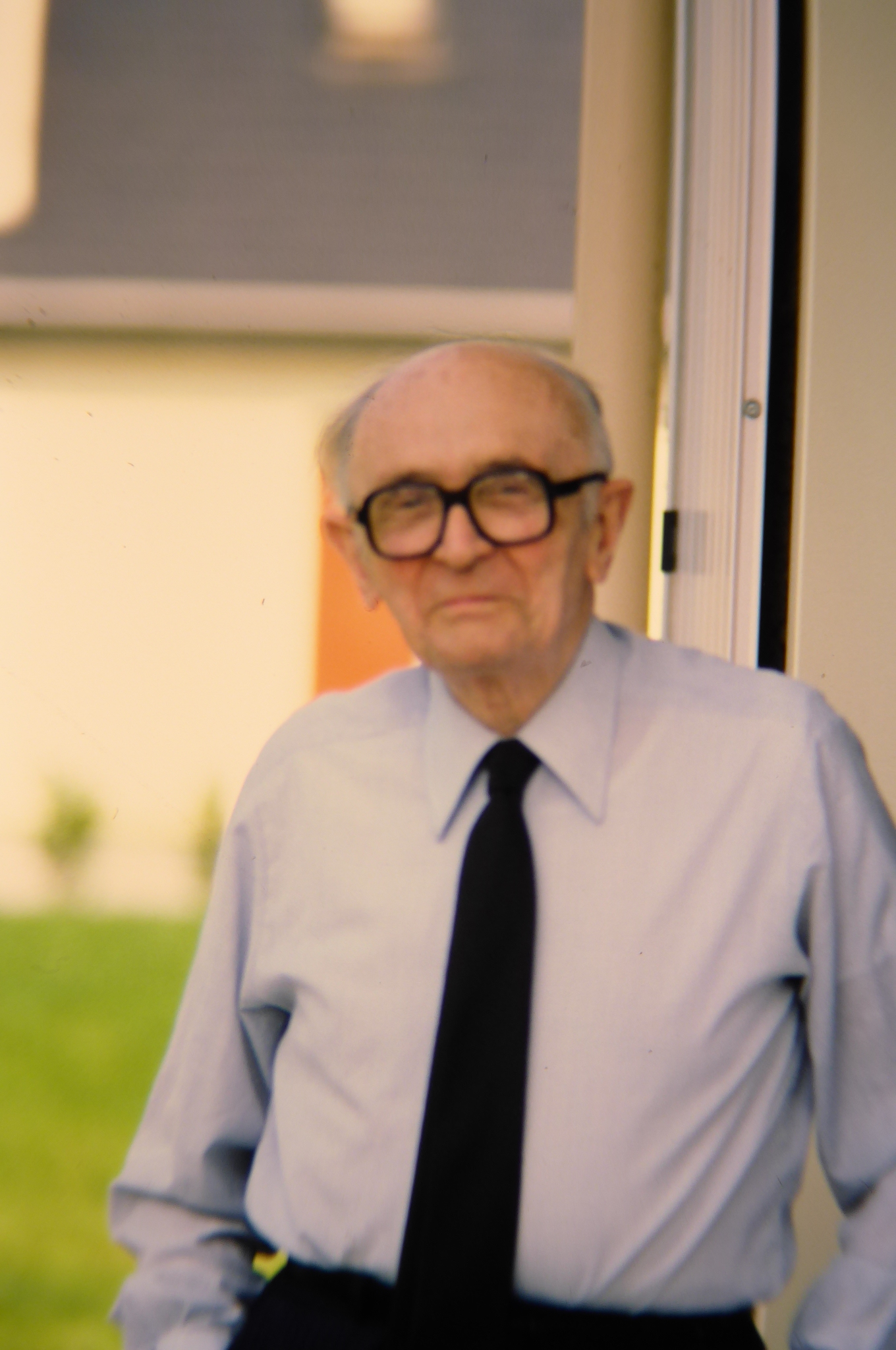
Portrait Jean Malo-Renault (1982)

He died at Rennes on 9 August 1988, aged 88. A street in Rennes bears his name since January 23, 1989

== Publications ==
- «La sculpture romane en Bretagne » ,'Thèse de l’École du Louvre. Mars 1926
- «Les Sculpteurs Romans des Saint-Benoit-sur--Loire», La Revue de l'art ancien et moderne, Part 1, avril 1927, p. 209-222
- «Les Sculpteurs Romans des Saint-Benoit-sur--Loire», La Revue de l'art ancien et moderne,Part 2, mai 1927, p. 315-322
- La chapelle de Notre-Dame de Tréminou, Bulletin d'Histoire d'Archéologie de Quimper, 1927
- La sculpture gothique en Bretagne : les calvaires », Revue de l'art, n^{o} 319, septembre-octobre 1930, p. 109-130. Notre-Dame de Tronoën, Chapelle (Finistère).
- Max Jacob : correspondence avec Jean Malo-Renault (1925)
- « Max Jacob par Max Jacob », Cahiers de l'Iroise,n^{o} 4, reprinted (tiré-à-part), (October–December 1987.8 o1925)
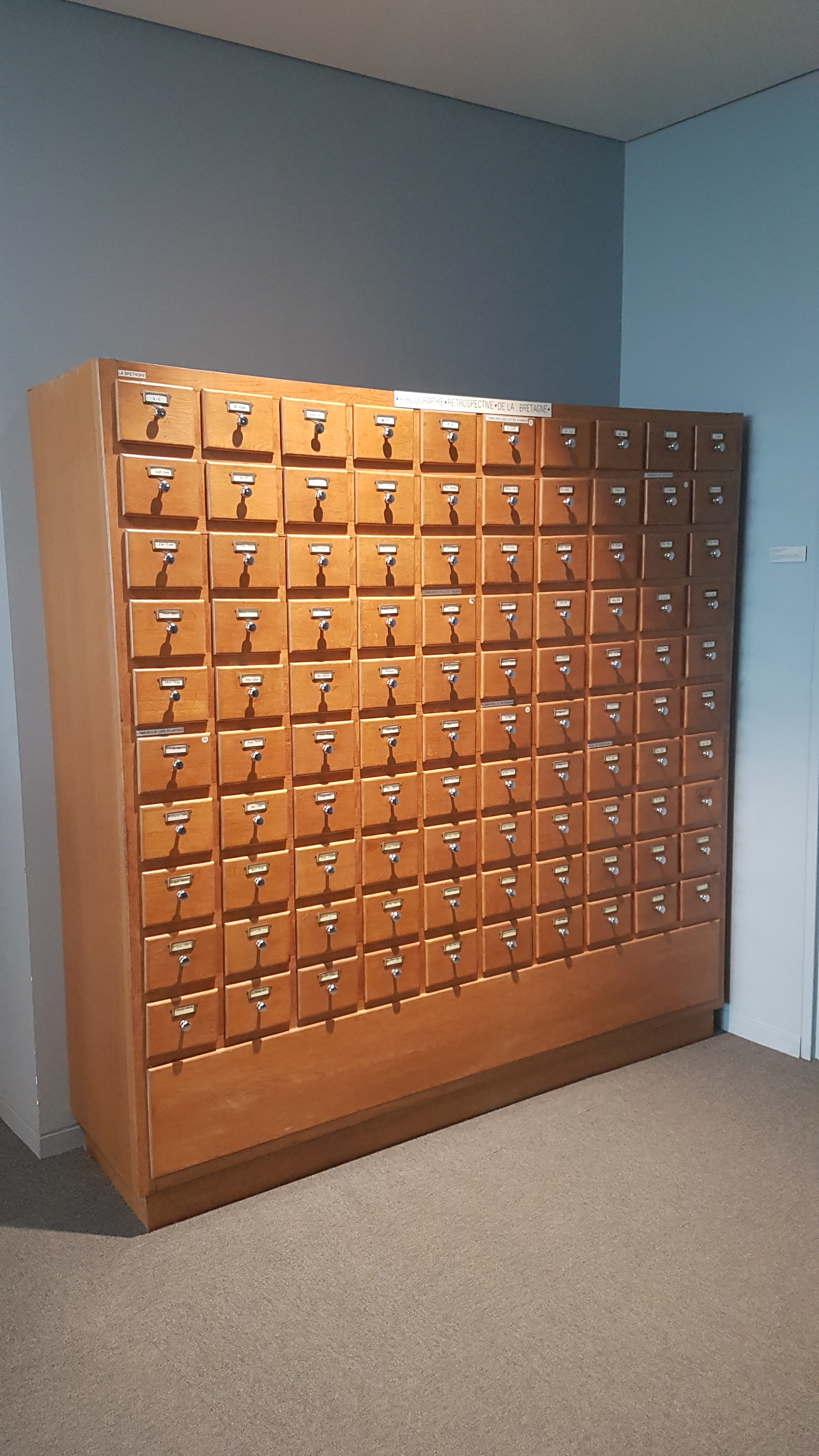
- Rennes Library - Heritage Hub Retrospective Bibliography Brittany de 1480 à 1960
- Au Musée de Toulouse, La porte des Apôtres de Saint-Étienne, Bulletin des Musées de France; juin1929
- Musée des Augustins de Toulouse. La porte de la Daurade, Bulletin des Musées de France, avril 1930
- « La sculpture gothique en Bretagne : les calvaires », Revue de l'art, n^{o} 319, September–October 1930, p. 109 to130. Notre-Dame de Tronoën, Chapel (Finistère).
- « L'art du livre », Bookstorest Garnier frères, Paris, 1931
- « Les monuments français en péril en Bretagne », Bulletin de l'Art, supplement of the Revue de l'Art, January 1932, p. 26 to 28.
- «Un Chansonnier de L’École de Jean Pucelle». Manuscrit à Montpellier, Les trésors des bibliothèques de France. T. IV, 1933.
- La lettre Ornée au Moyen Age 1 & 2. According to the manuscripts of Montpellier (1934) La Revue de l'Art ancien et moderne, LXV, 1934, p. 97-110 20et p. 145-164.21
  A summary of publications (title pages)
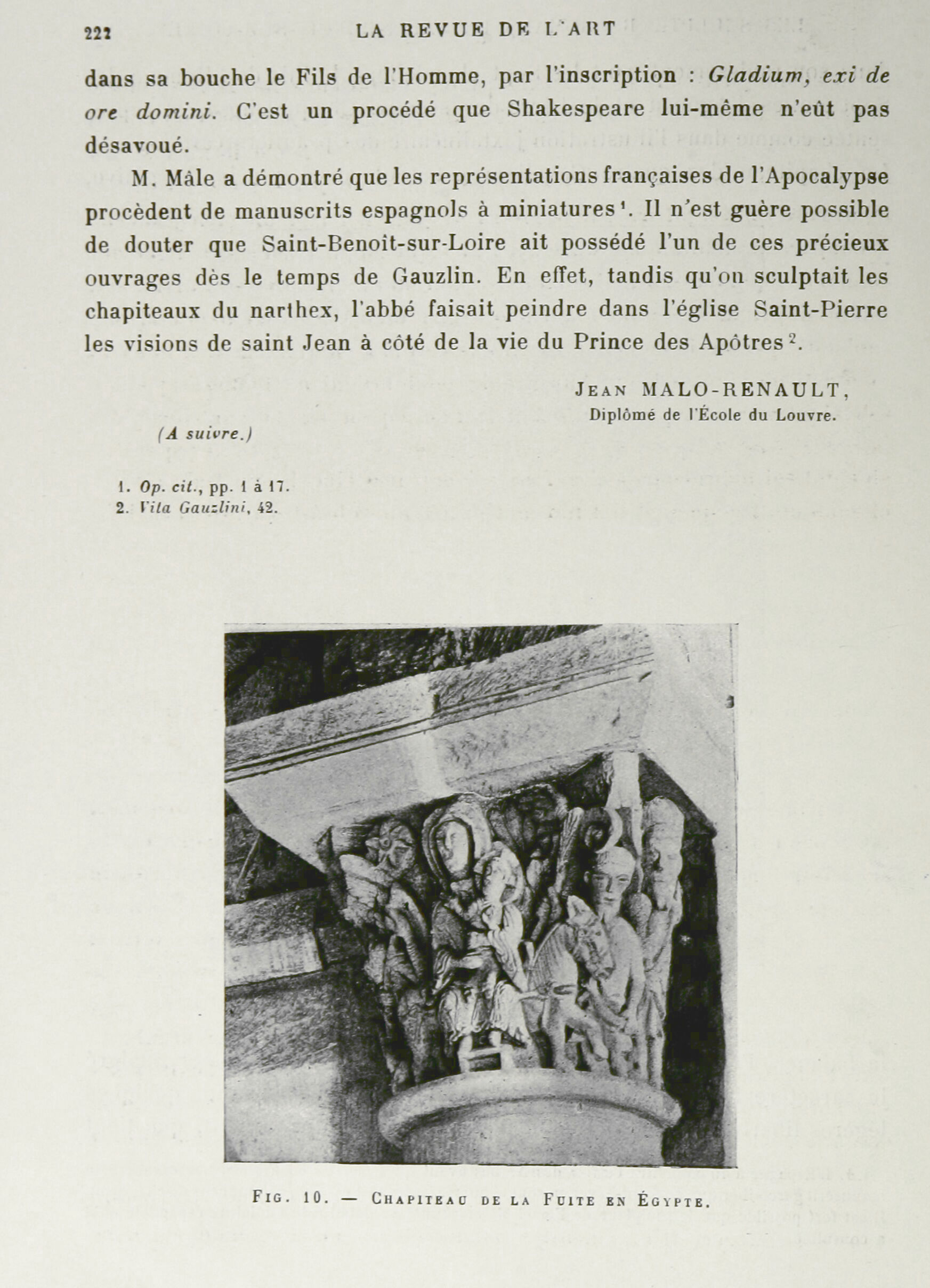
  Chapiteau de l'abbaye de Saint Benoit-sur-Loire (avril 1927)
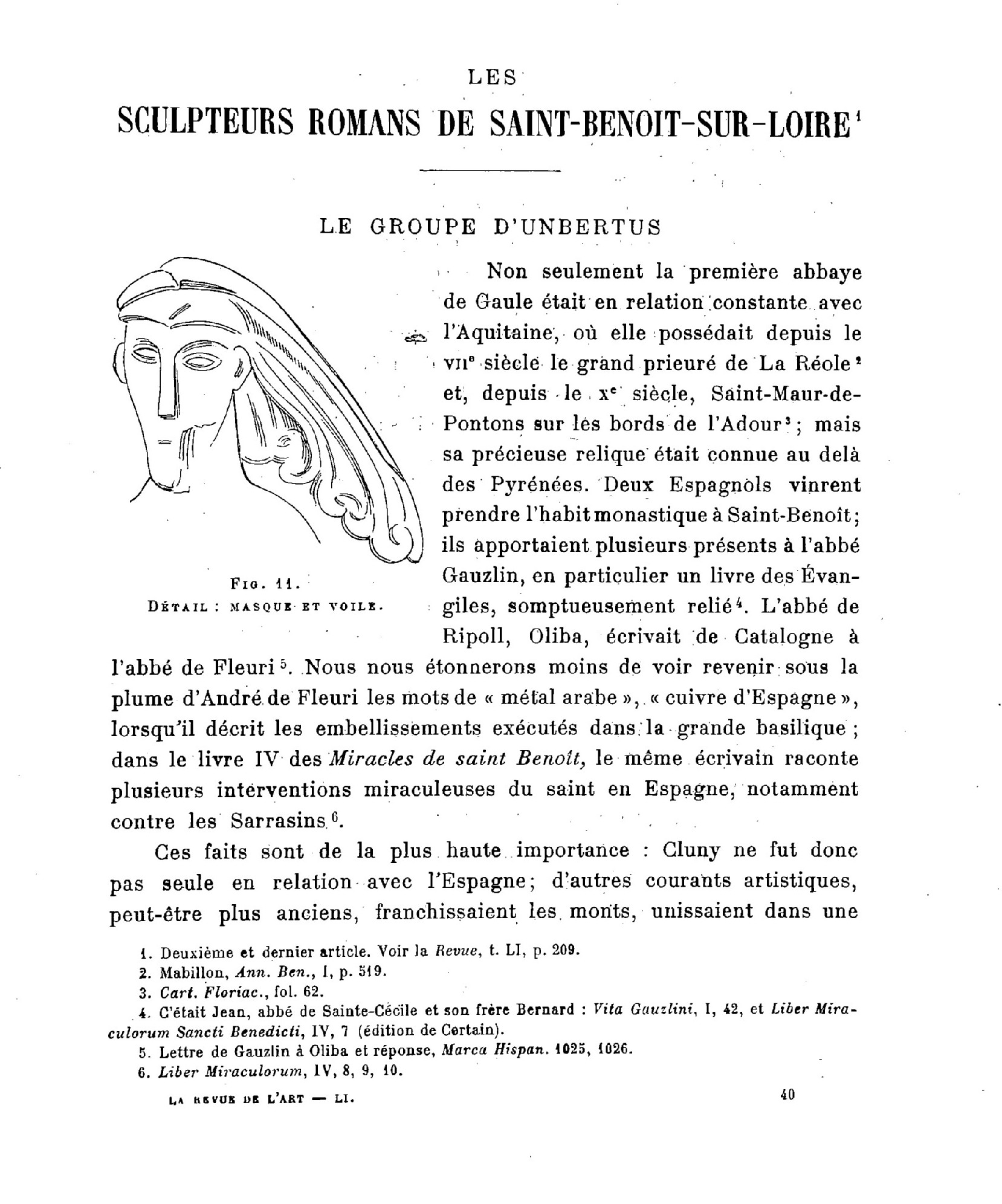
  Sculpteurs Romans de St-Benoit sur Loire (mai 1927) Le Groupe D'unbertus.
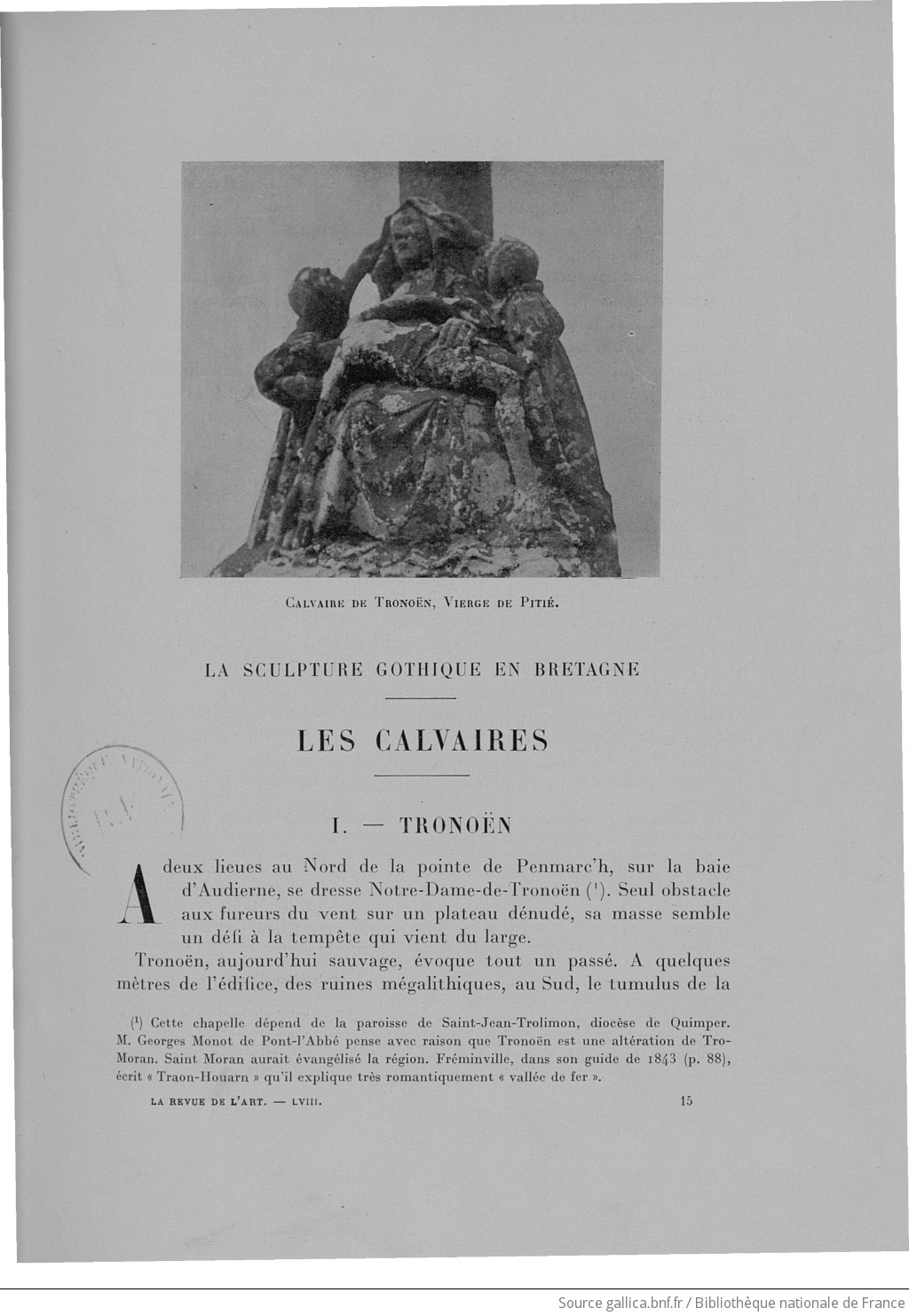
  La sculpture gothique en Bretagne. LES CALVAIRES (1930)
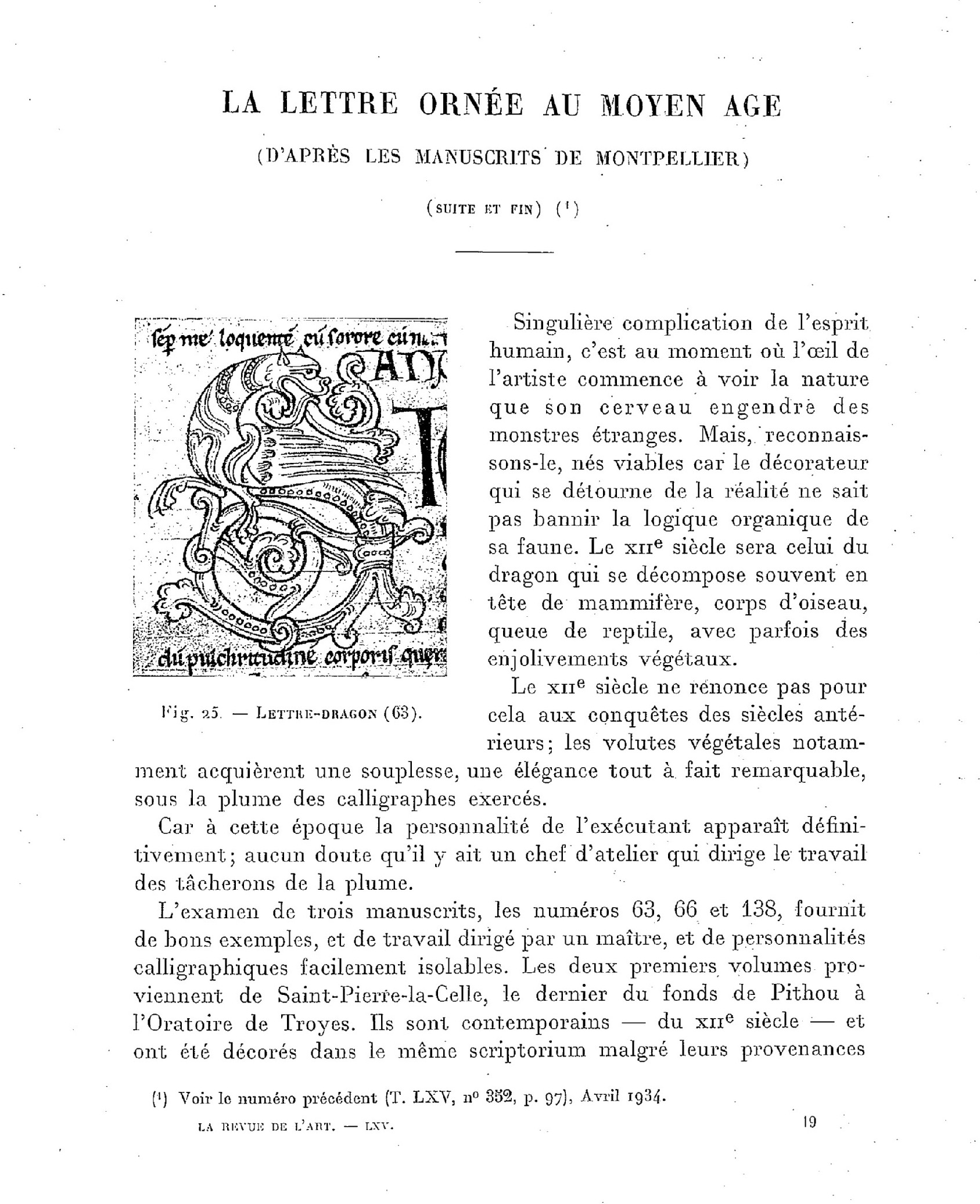
  La Lettre Ornée au Moyen Age (1934) (D'après les manuscrits de Montpellier)
- Le Malouin Jean Le Cudennec, roi de Madagascar, typed plate, 1948, 5 p.
- « L'église de Fouesnant » periodical, Fouesnant, n^{o} 4, 1974, p. 11 to 17^{,}
- « Notes sur trois cathédrales bretonnes » Notebook n° 103 - 26 ème année n° 3, Cahiers de l'Iroise, 1979, p. 141 to 145.
- Notice sur la Bibliographie Rétrospective de la Bretagne, 1972.
- Bibliographie rétrospective de la Bretagne 1480-1960 150 000 handwritten records, on microfiche since 1987.
- Les Pseudonymes des Bretons, XVI^{e} – XX^{e} siècles, 2 volumes, reissue. 1987-1988^{,}
