= Malo (given name) =

Malo is a given name of the following notable people:

- Théophile-Malo de La Tour d'Auvergne-Corret (1743-1800), Breton military and linguist
- Charles Malo François Lameth (1757–1832), French politician and soldier
- Tez Cadey (born Malo Brisout de Barneville in 1993), French-American DJ, record producer and songwriter
- Malo Gusto (born 2003), French football player
- Scribe (rapper) (born Malo Ioane Luafutu in 1979), New Zealand rapper
- Malo Quéméneur (born 1998), Breton slalom canoeist
- Malo Vaga (born 1965), Samoan football manager and referee
