= Malo language =

Malo language may refer to:

- Tamambo language (Vanuatu)
- Melo language (Ethiopia)
- Malo dialect of the Santa Cruz language (Solomon Islands)

== See also ==
- Maloh language (Borneo, Indonesia)
