= Tez Cadey =

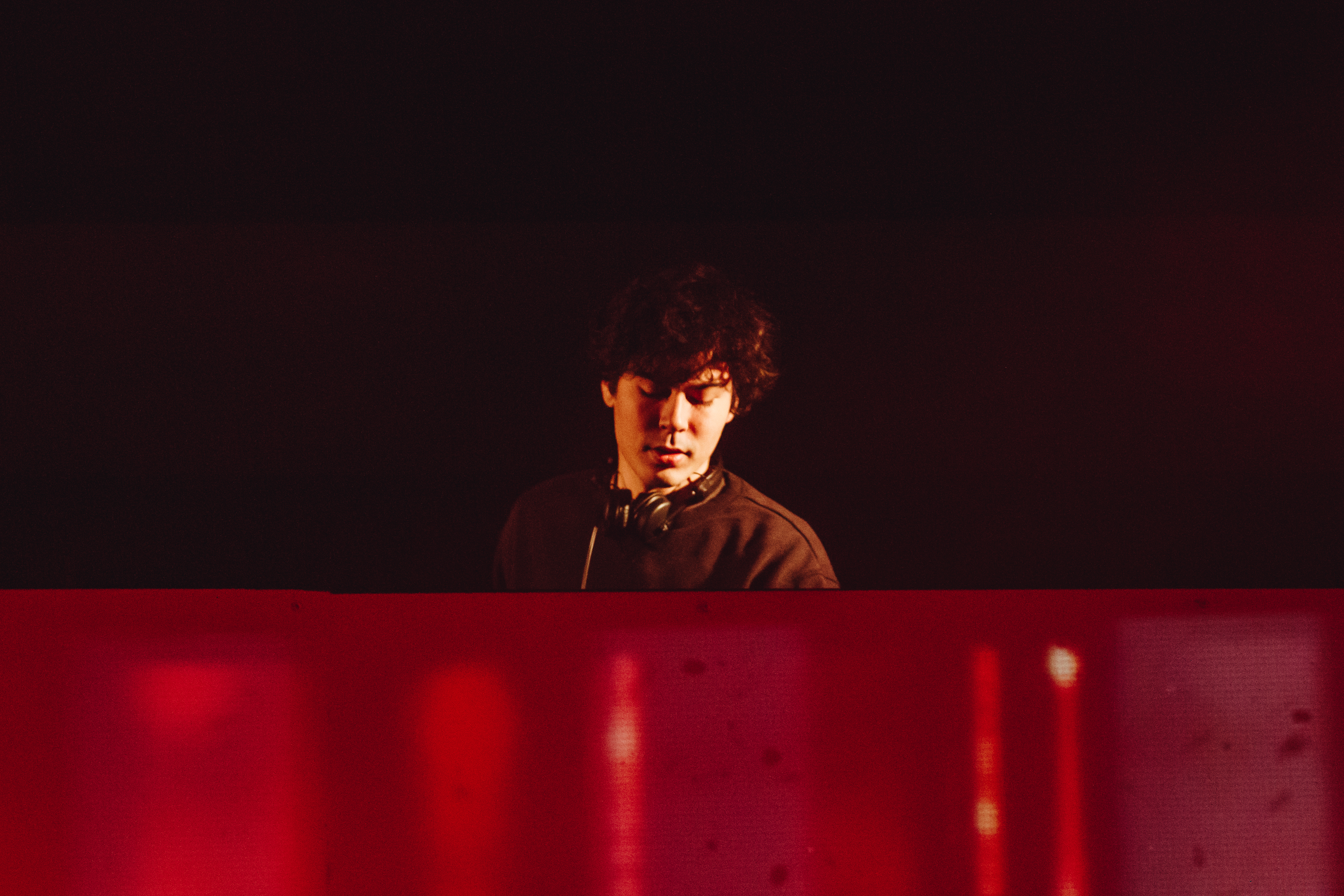
- Tez Cadey performing on stage in 2019

Background information
- Born: Malo Brisout; August 3, 1993 (age 32); Morristown, New Jersey, U.S.
- Genres: Deep house; tropical house; indie dance
- Occupations: DJ; record producer; songwriter
- Years active: 2011–present
- Label: Arista France
- Website: tezcadey.com

Malo Brisout de Barneville (born August 3, 1993), better known by his stage name Tez Cadey, is a French American DJ, record producer and songwriter. He is most known for his single "Seve" released in 2015.

== Career ==
Born in Morristown, New Jersey to a French father and a Cambodian mother, Brisout began playing music early in his youth, first on the piano, then the guitar. He grew up to the music his parents listened to, including bands like New Order or Inner City. When he was sixteen he began composing and posting online his remixes and productions.

In 2014, he released his EP "Seve" independently. It received such popular attention that the EP was taken down and the song re-released with Ultra Music in 2015. "Seve" has since then reached more than 300 million streams worldwide.

== Discography ==
=== Albums ===
- 2015 : Walls EP
- 2018 : Lizard Days
- 2021 : No Place I Call Home

=== Singles ===
Year	Title	Peak chart positions		
Year	Title	FRA	BEL	SWE
2015	"Seve"	110	41	74
2016	"Walls" feat. Julia Church [Summer Mix]	—	—	—
2017	"Ivory" feat. Patawawa	—	—	—
2017	"—" denotes a recording that did not chart or was not released in that territory.			
