= Nori Malo-Renault =

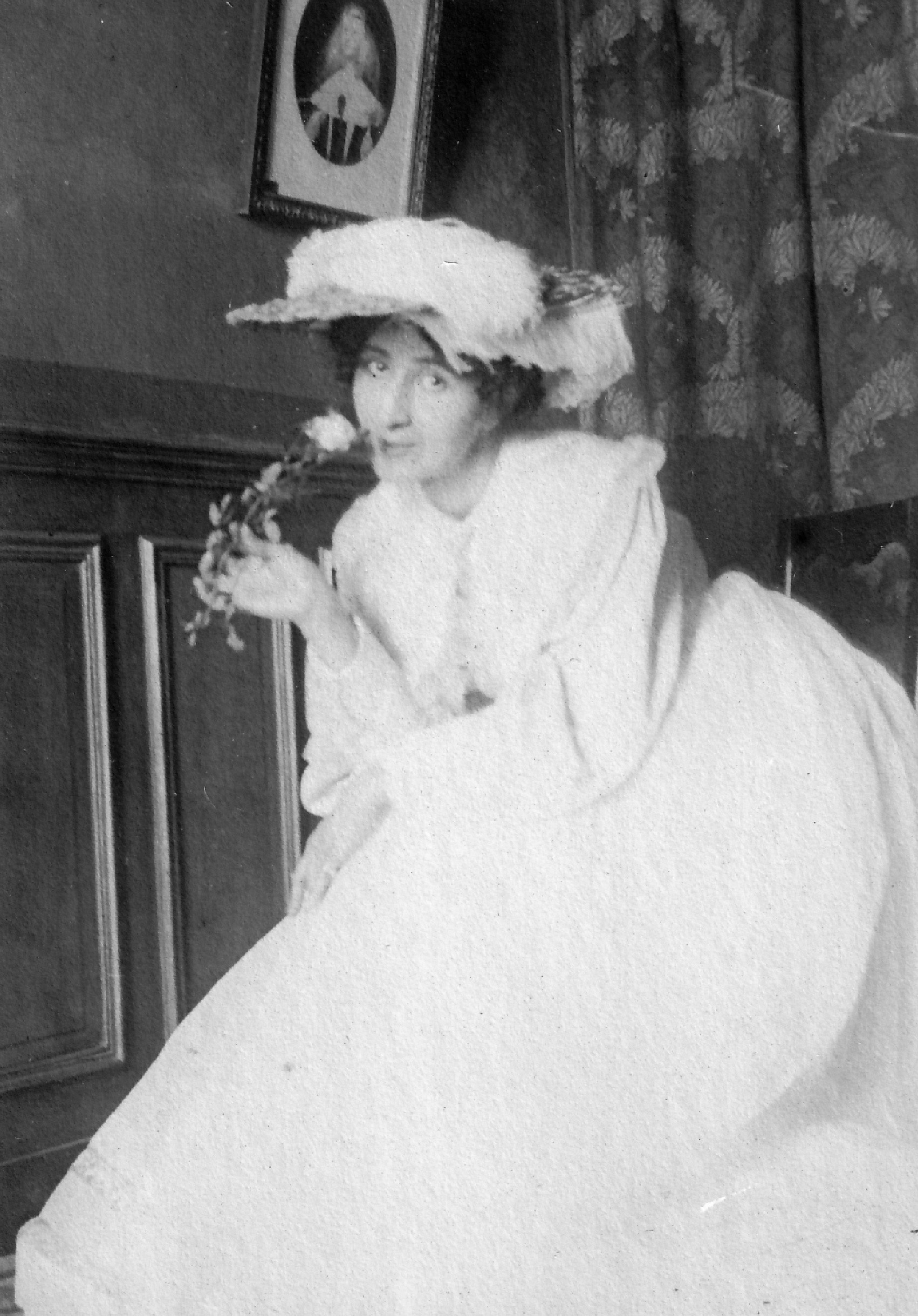
- Born: Honorine Césarine Tian; January 20, 1871; Marseille, France
- Died: January 29, 1953 (aged 82); Pau, France
- Education: Élève de l'École nationale supérieure des beaux-arts au XIXe siècle
- Occupations: Etching & printmaker (color printing by registration)
- Style: Art décoratif céramique de Sèvre
- Movement: Figuratif, art nouveau
- Spouse: Émile Malo-Renault
- Children: Jean Malo-Renault
- Website: www.malo-renault.fr

Signature
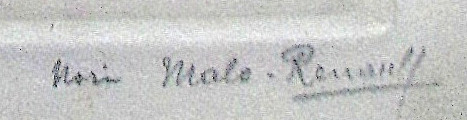

Nori Malo-Renault, pseudonym of Honorine Césarine Tian . French woman etcher from the early 20th century. She specialized in the printing of color engravings. She was also a fine craft artist, creating embroidered pictures and bindings for rare books. She was born on January 20, 1871 in Marseille France and on January 29, 1953 died at Pau, France. She was a French etcher, color printmaker.

== Biography ==
Nori Malo-Renault studied at the Beaux-Arts de Paris, in the studio of Luc-Olivier Merson. In 1897 she married the painter pastellist Émile Auguste Renault (1870-1938), known as Malo-Renault.

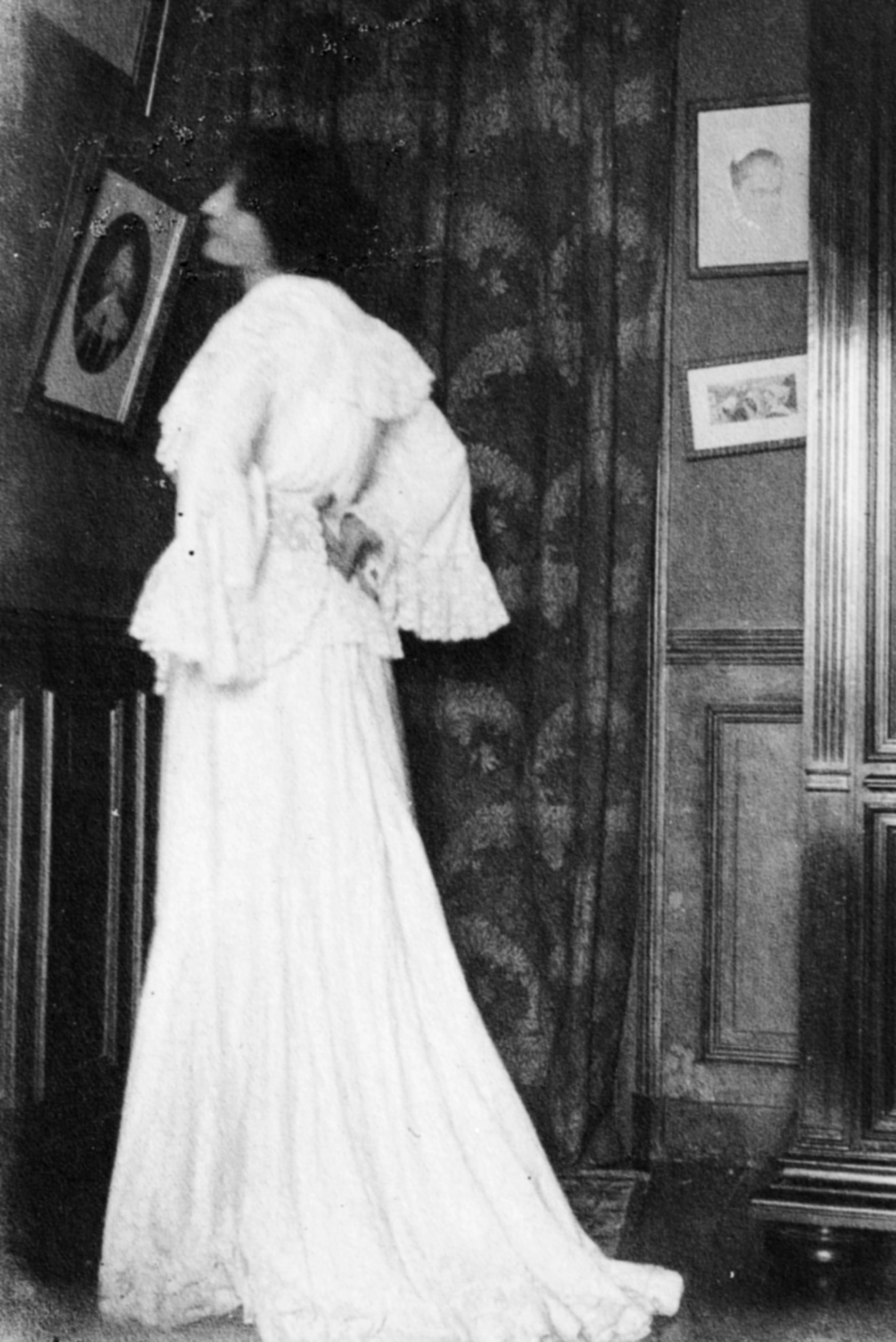
Portrait of Nori Malo-Renault (1900)

She helps her husband with the printing of his illustrations, in particular for Le Serpent Noir of Paul Adam. Under the name of Nori Malo-Renault, she exhibited at the Salon des Artistes Français from 1897 and some Binding Decorate, then at the salon de la Société nationale des beaux-arts from 1902 to 1912.

== Works ==
Nori Malo-Renault produced etchings in color, by printing successively inked matrix of the different colors onto the paper in correct alignment to provide the color print, this is called the printing registration. For example for the print of La Femme au masque after a pastel by Edmond Aman-Jean whose five plates of copper (one by color) are kept in Paris at the Chalcographie du Louvre.

=== Salomé, original etching. Character from the play'Oscar Wilde ===
The original print Salomé, color etching, are also kept (three matrix of copper) at the Chalcographie du Louvre. A cover decoration on the model of the Salomé print was embroidered by Nori Malo-Renault. This book is kept at the BnF

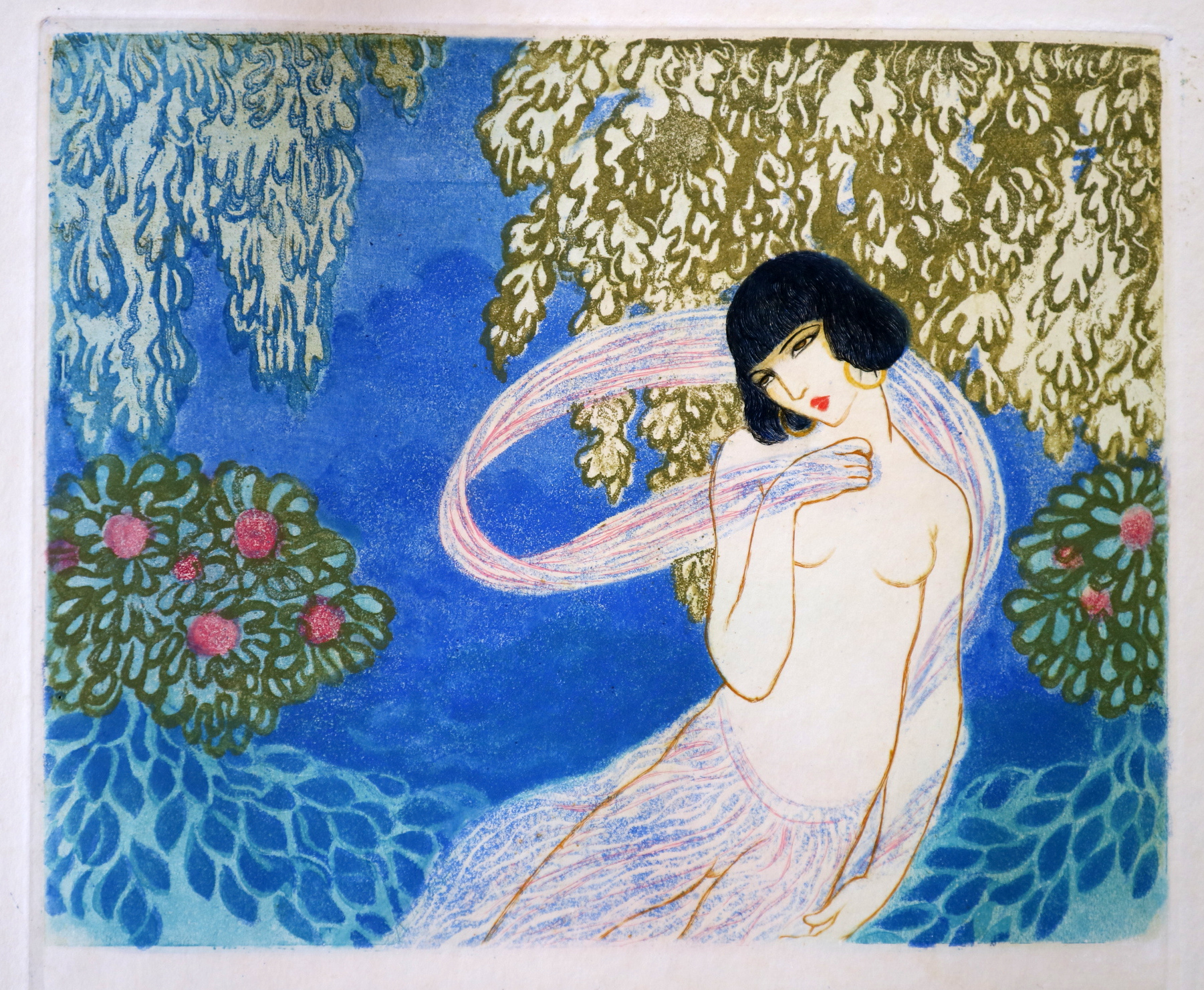
The original print Salomé, color etching

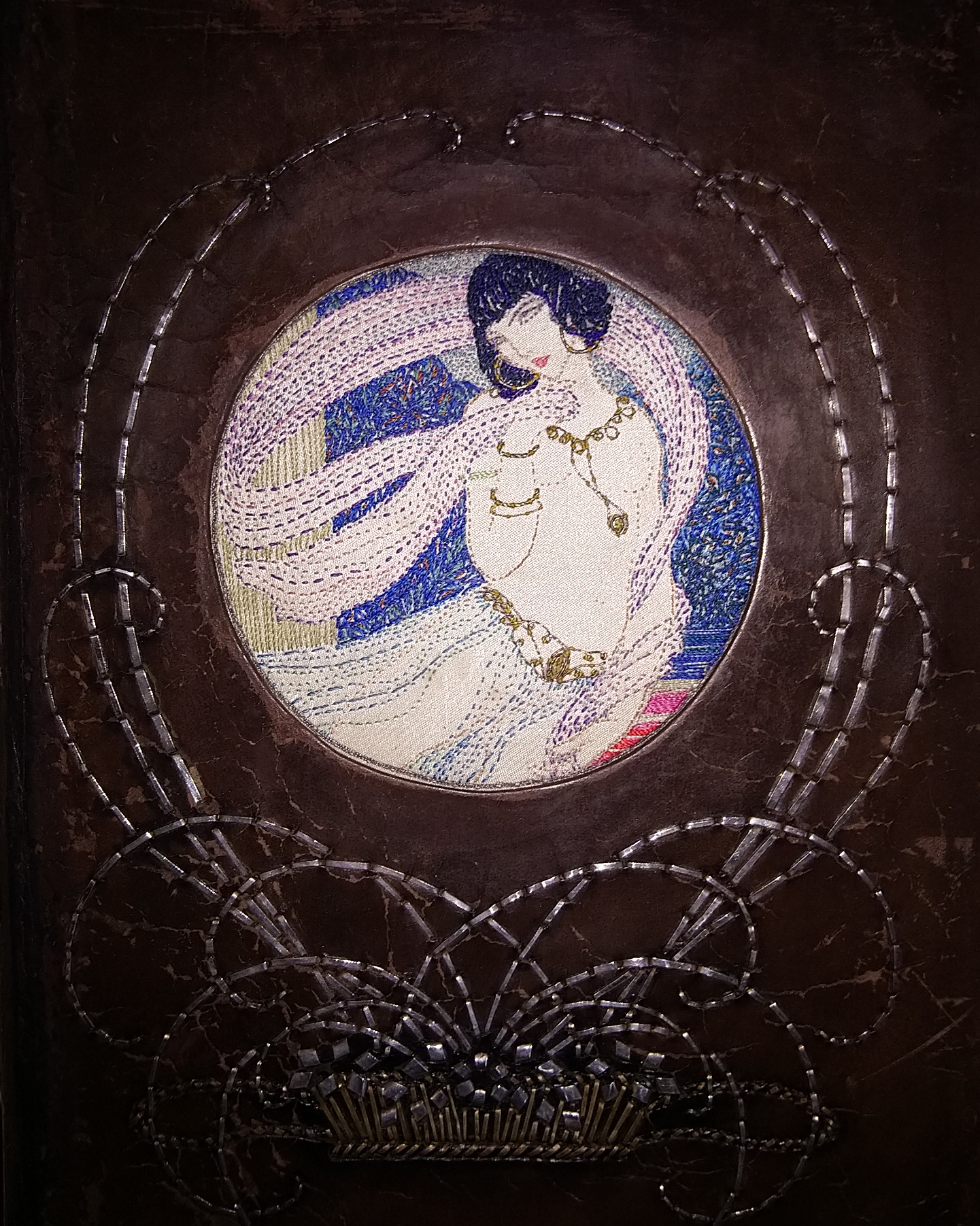
Cover book, libretto of Oscar Wilde's play

Some of his prints, mainly in color etchings, are kept in Paris in the prints and photography department of the Bibliothèque nationale de France.

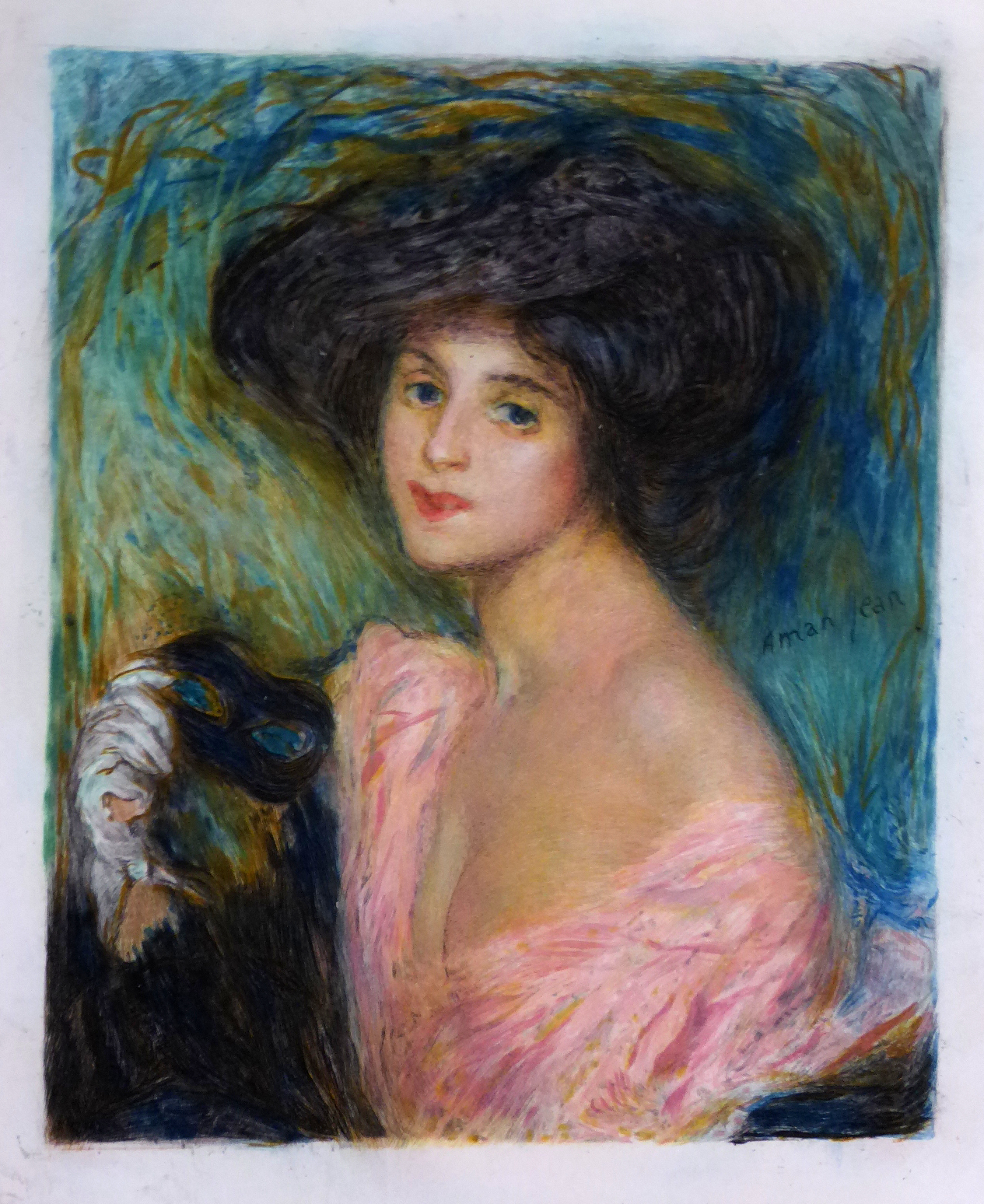
Pastel the Woman in the Mask by Aman-Jean, performed here by Nori Malo-Renault, etching, aquatint, drypoint.

Color test by Nori Malo-Renault

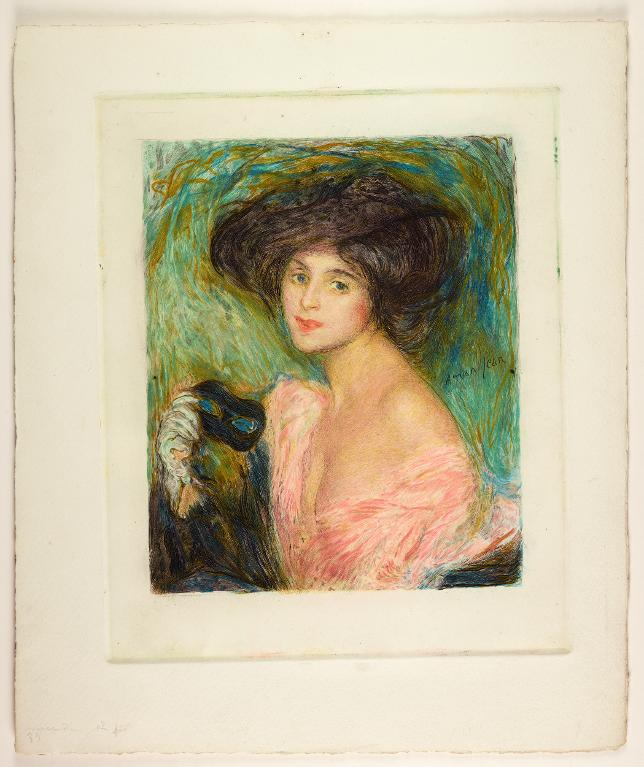

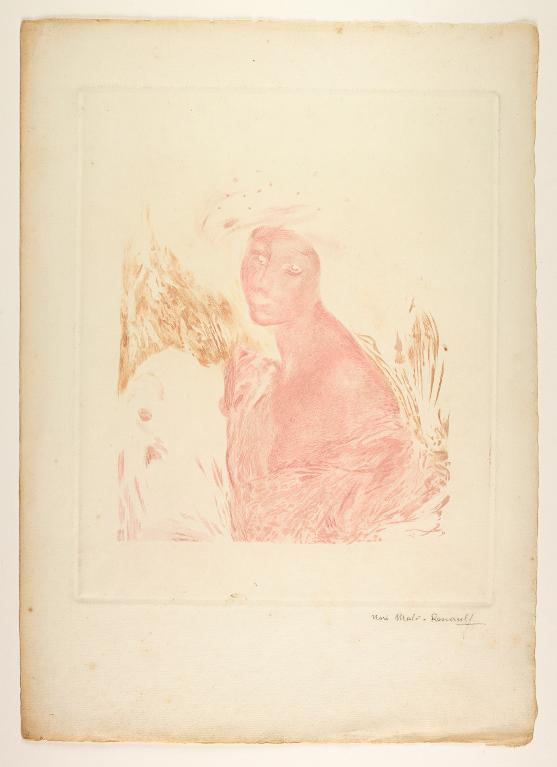

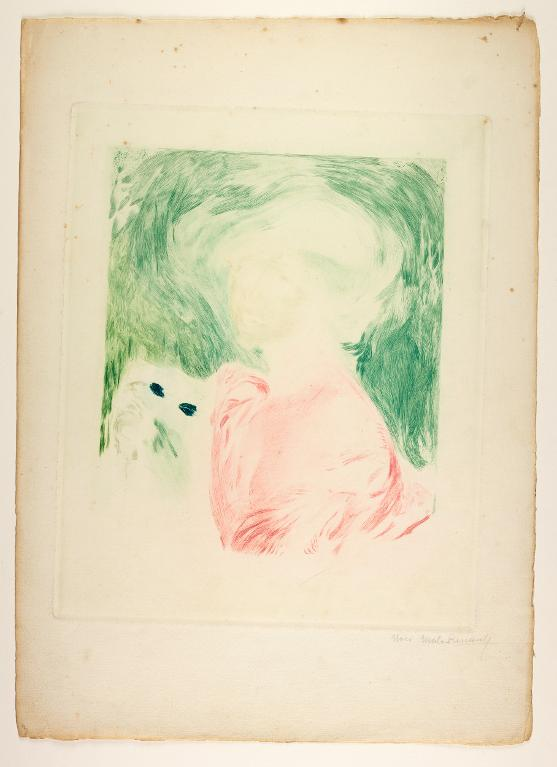

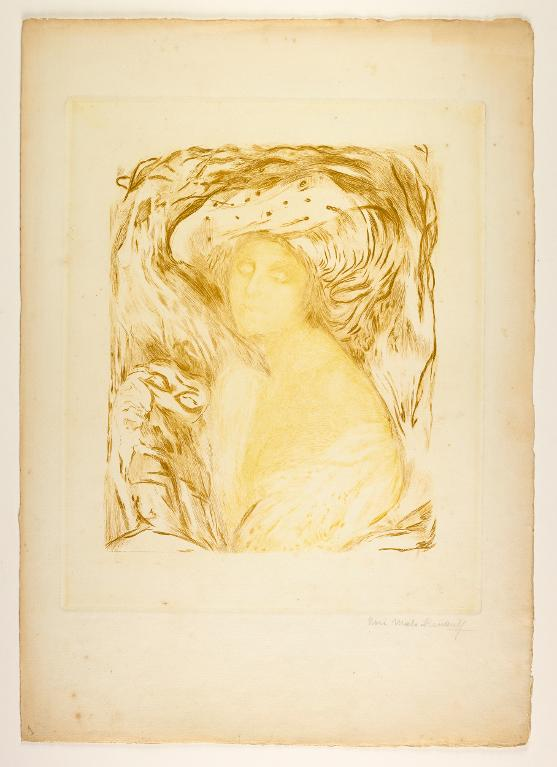

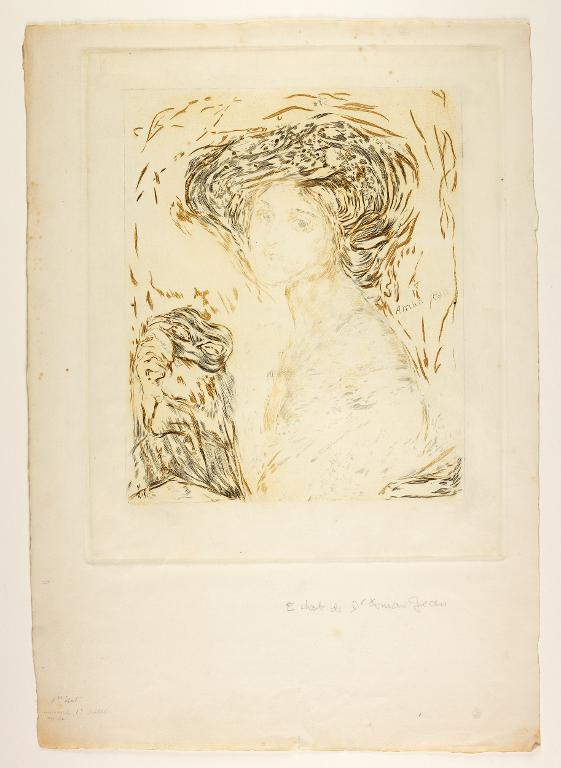

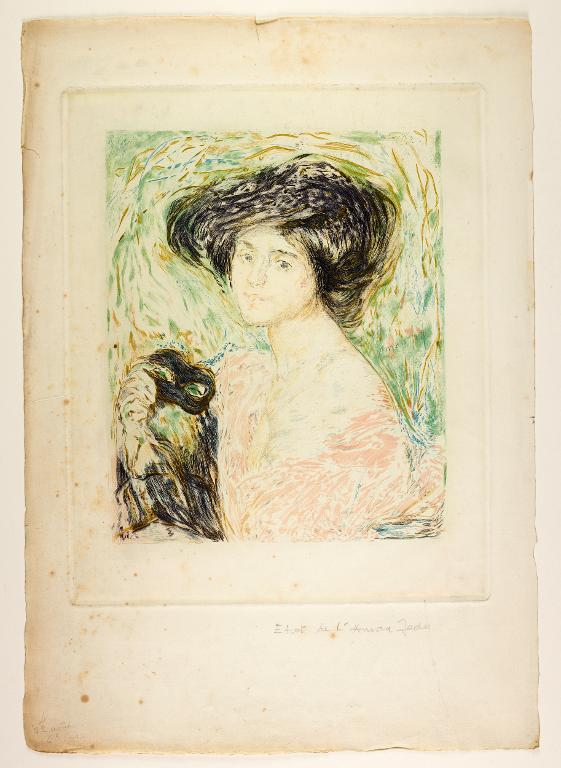

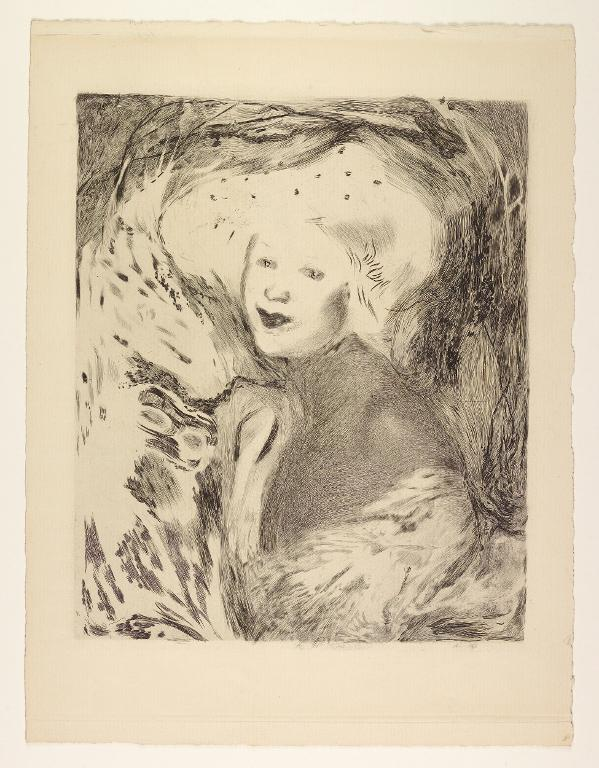

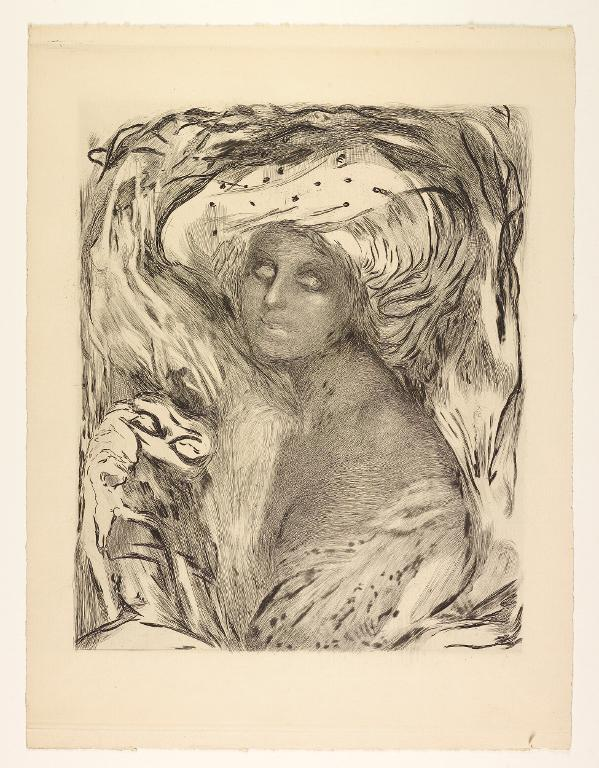

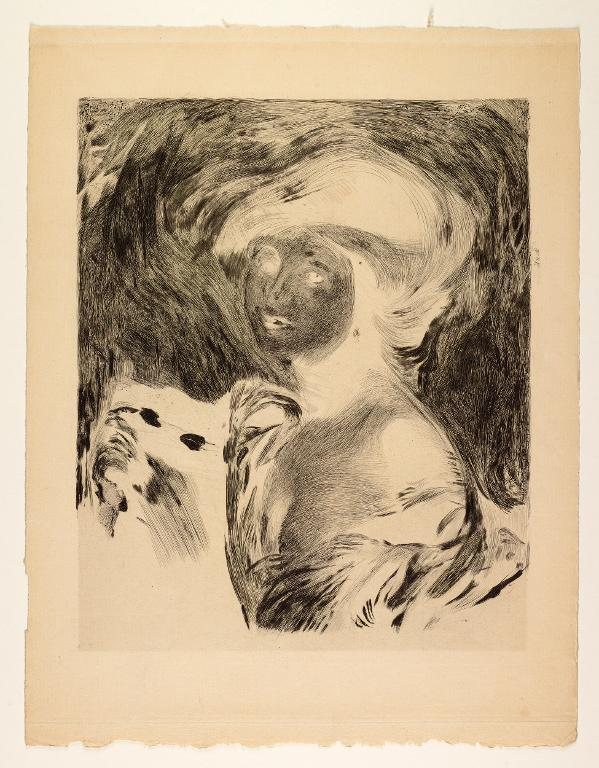

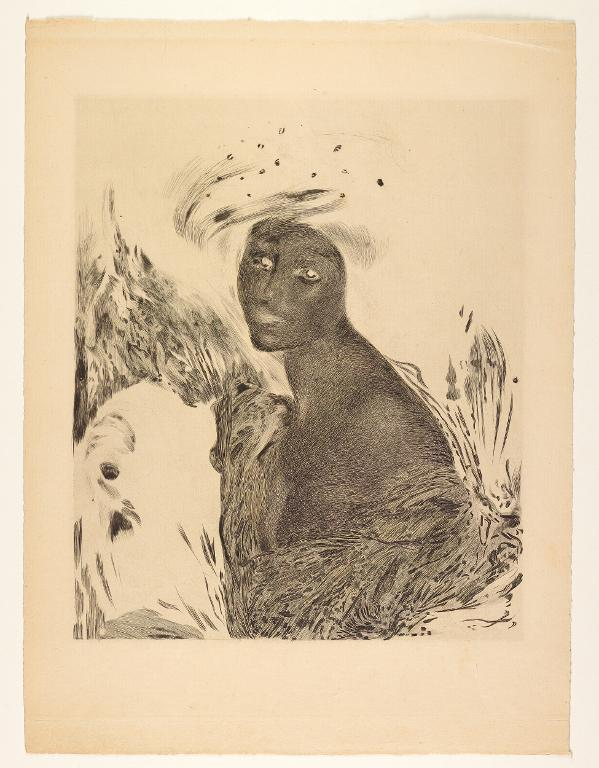

== Prints ==
A few etchings (original or interpretive) & a monotype in color)

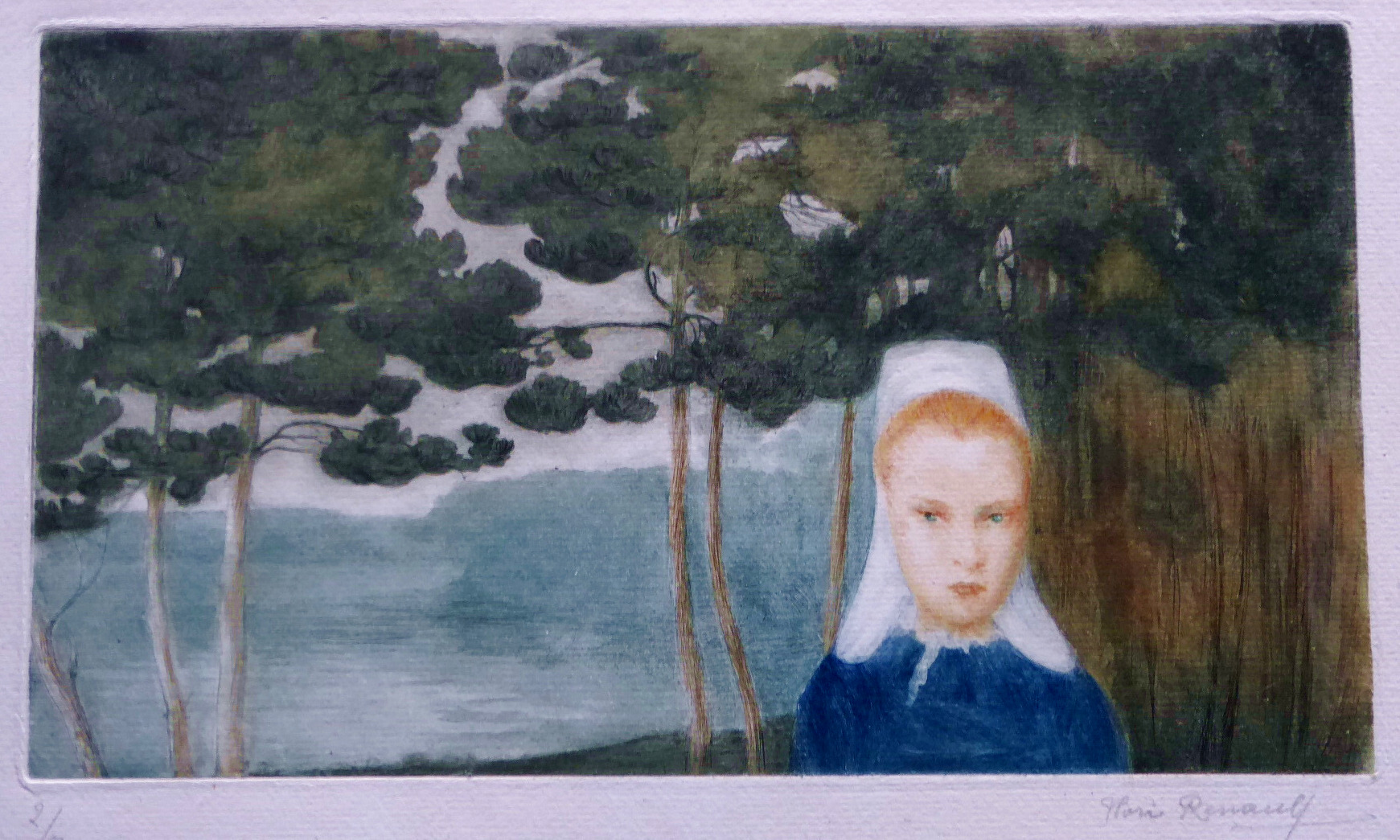
Marie-Annick, Original color etcher

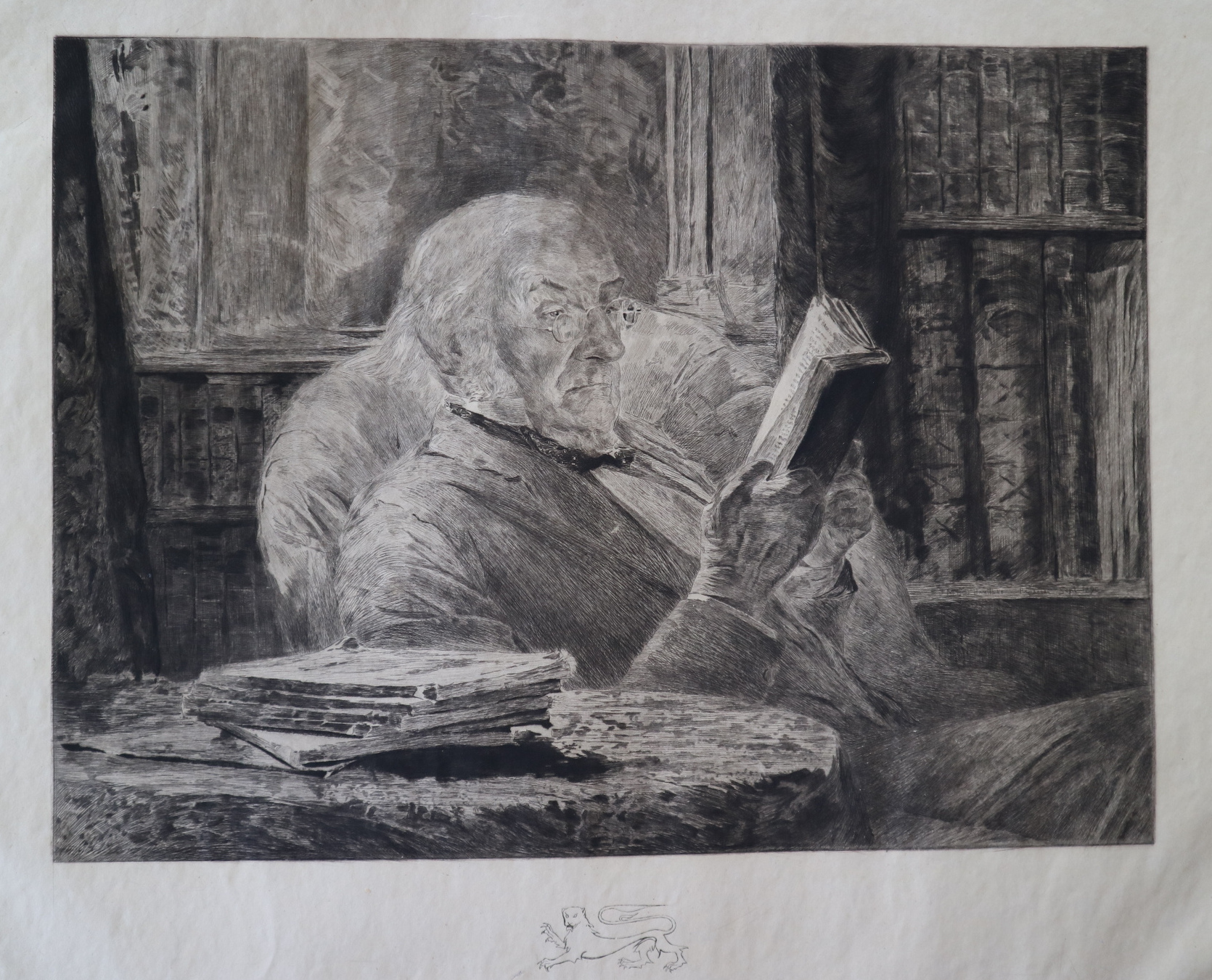
Portrait of William Ewar Gladstone, after John Mc Lure Hamiltond

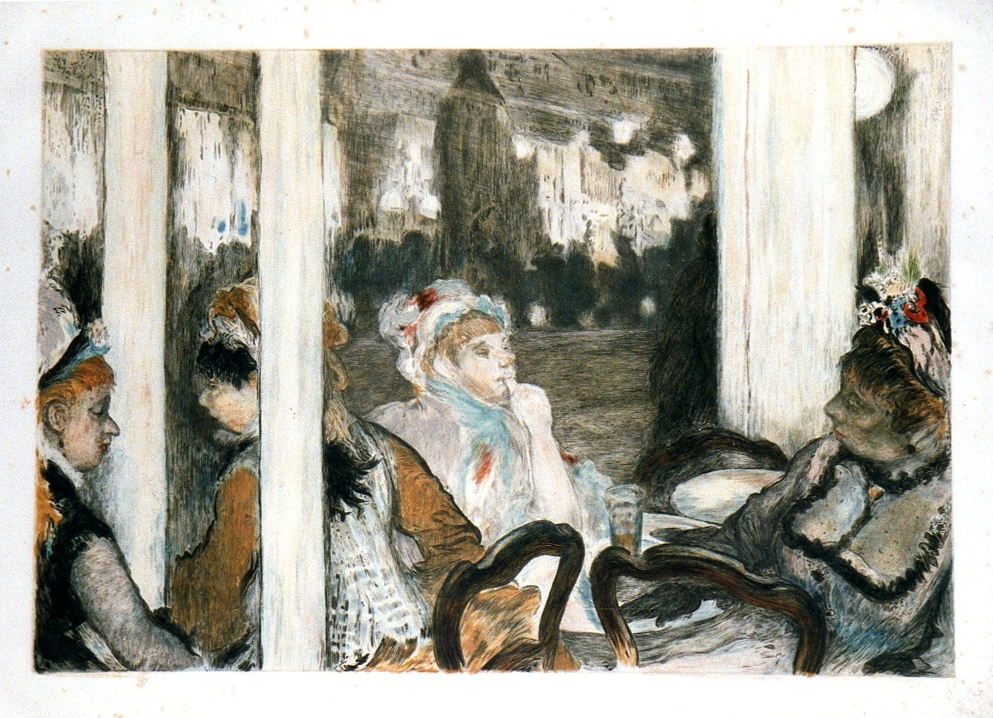
Le petit Café, color etcher after Edgar Degas

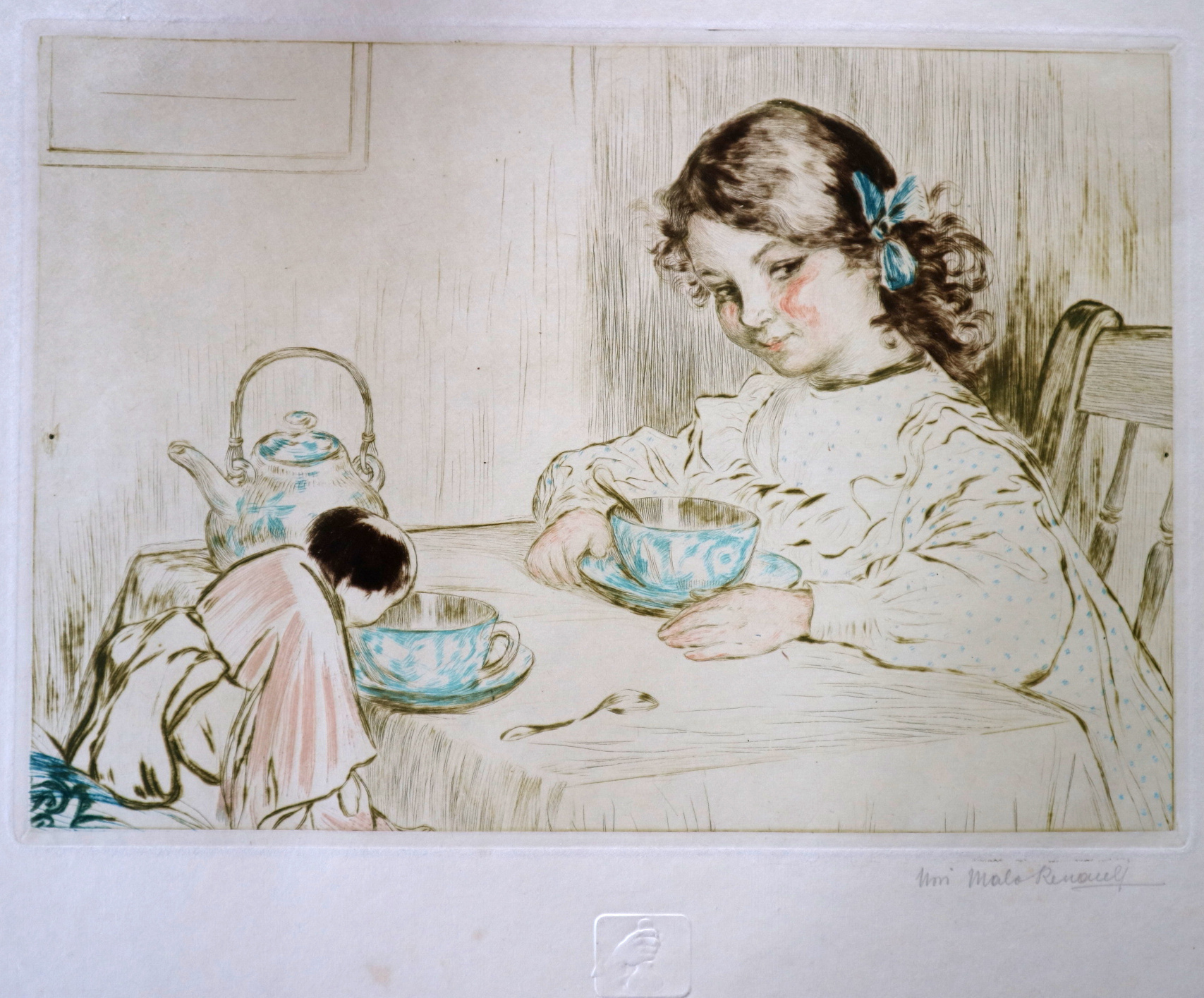
La Dinette

Monotype in color
- La Femme au Masque, after Edmond Aman-Jean, etching, drypoint and aquatint in color
- Salomé, original etching in color
- Marie-Annick, original etching in color
- Le Petit café, etching in color 440 × 300 mm.
- Portrait of William Ewart Gladston, Prime Minister of the United Kingdom, monochrome etching after a lithography by John McLure Hamilton.
- L'Oréal (allegory), original etching in color
- Portrait of Fanny Charrin, after a miniature by Augustin, etching in color.
- Breakfast or Little Girl and Japanese Do, original etching in color,
- Dinnette à la poupée chinoise, original etching in color

== Cover Books ==
Cover designs by Nori Malo-Renault

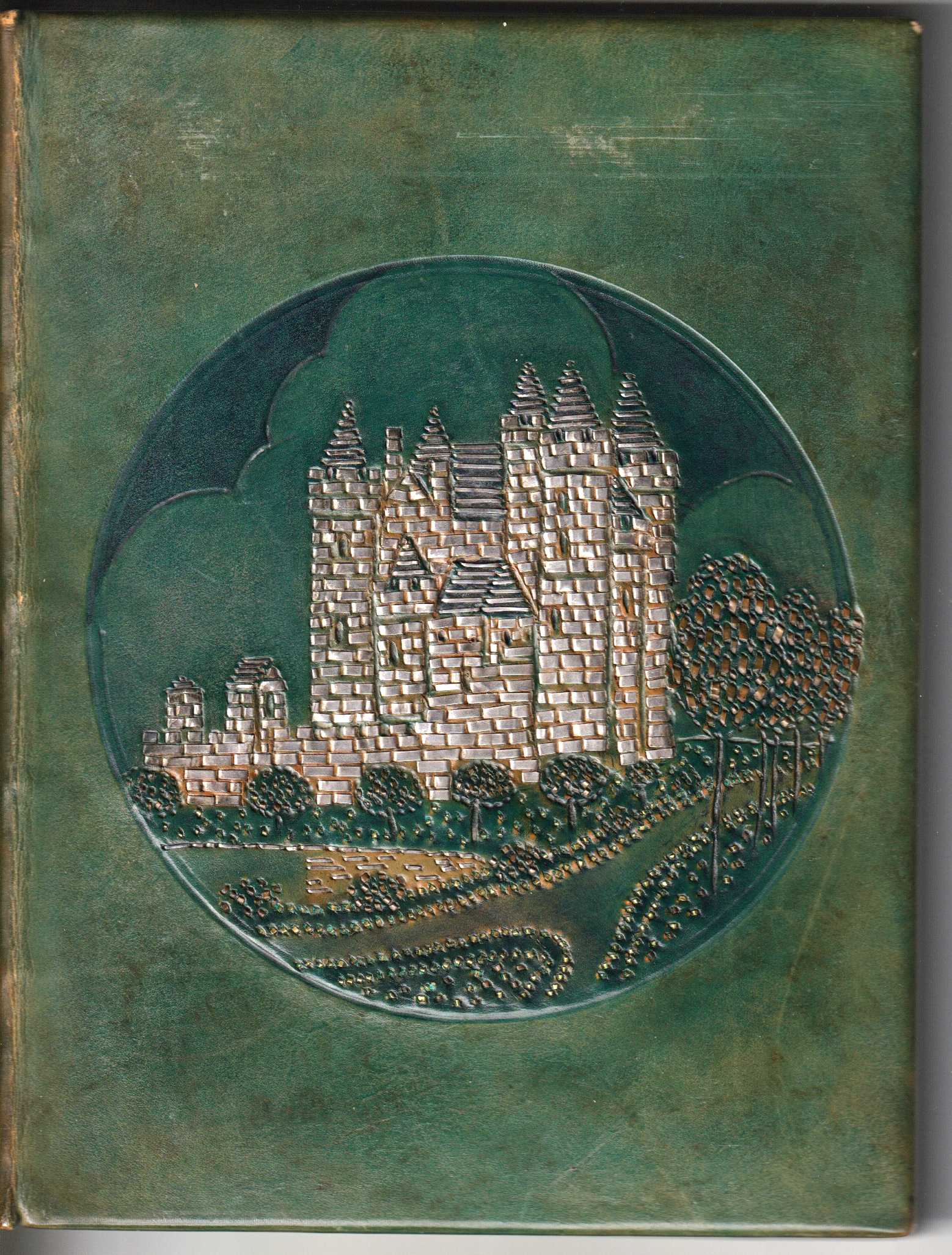
Lamé d'argent (1893)

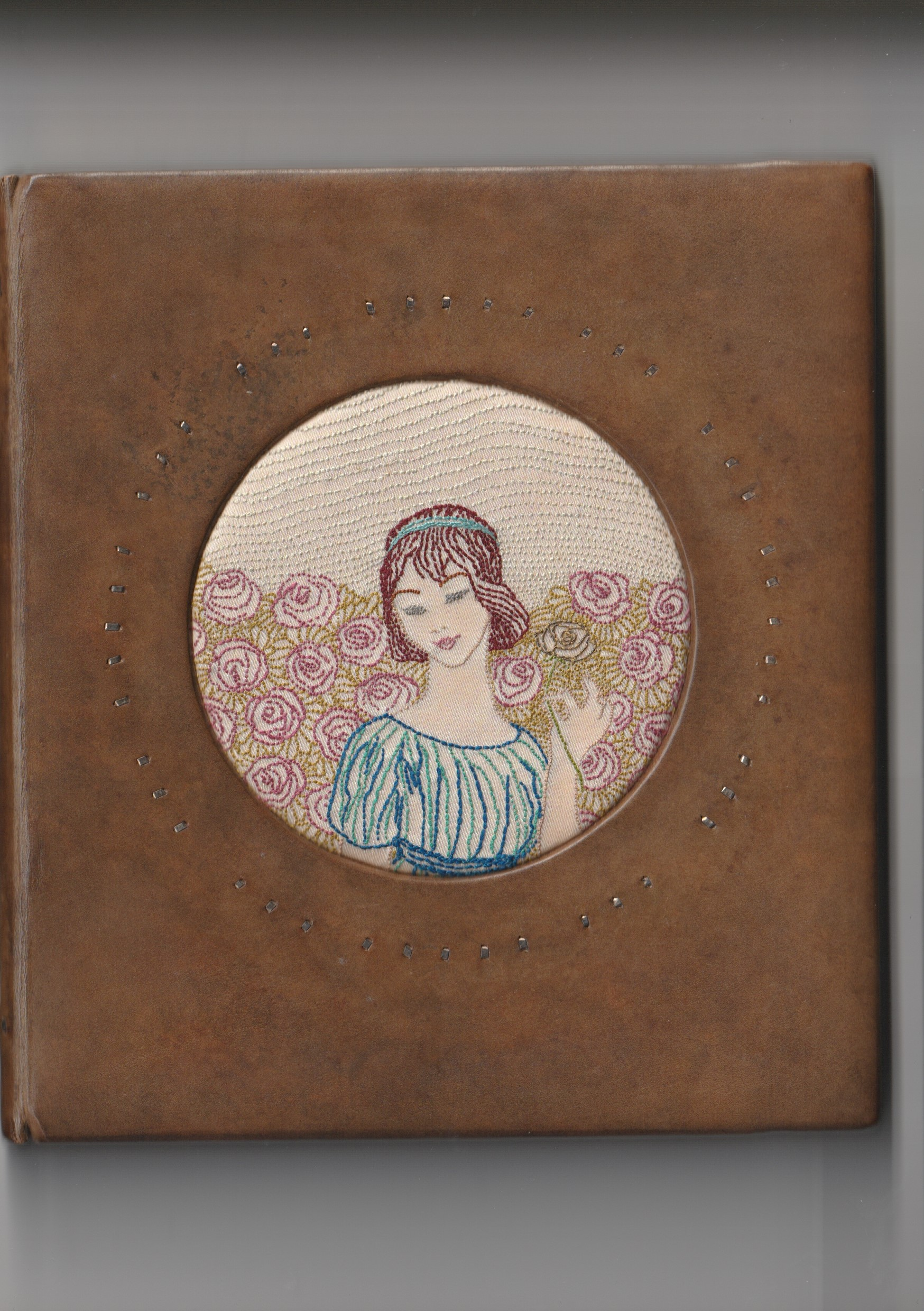
Broderie dans un cercle

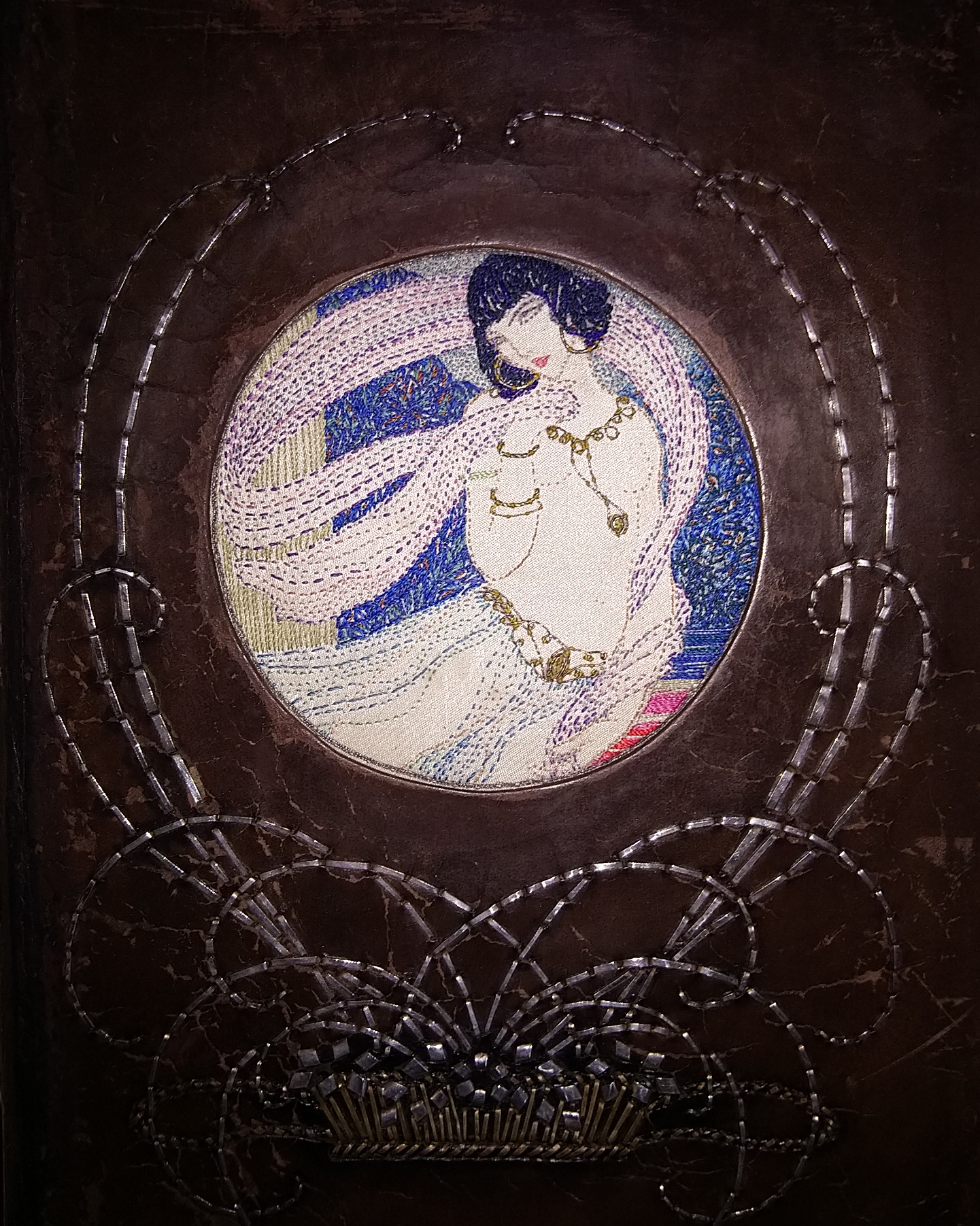
Salomé, libretto of Oscar Wilde's play

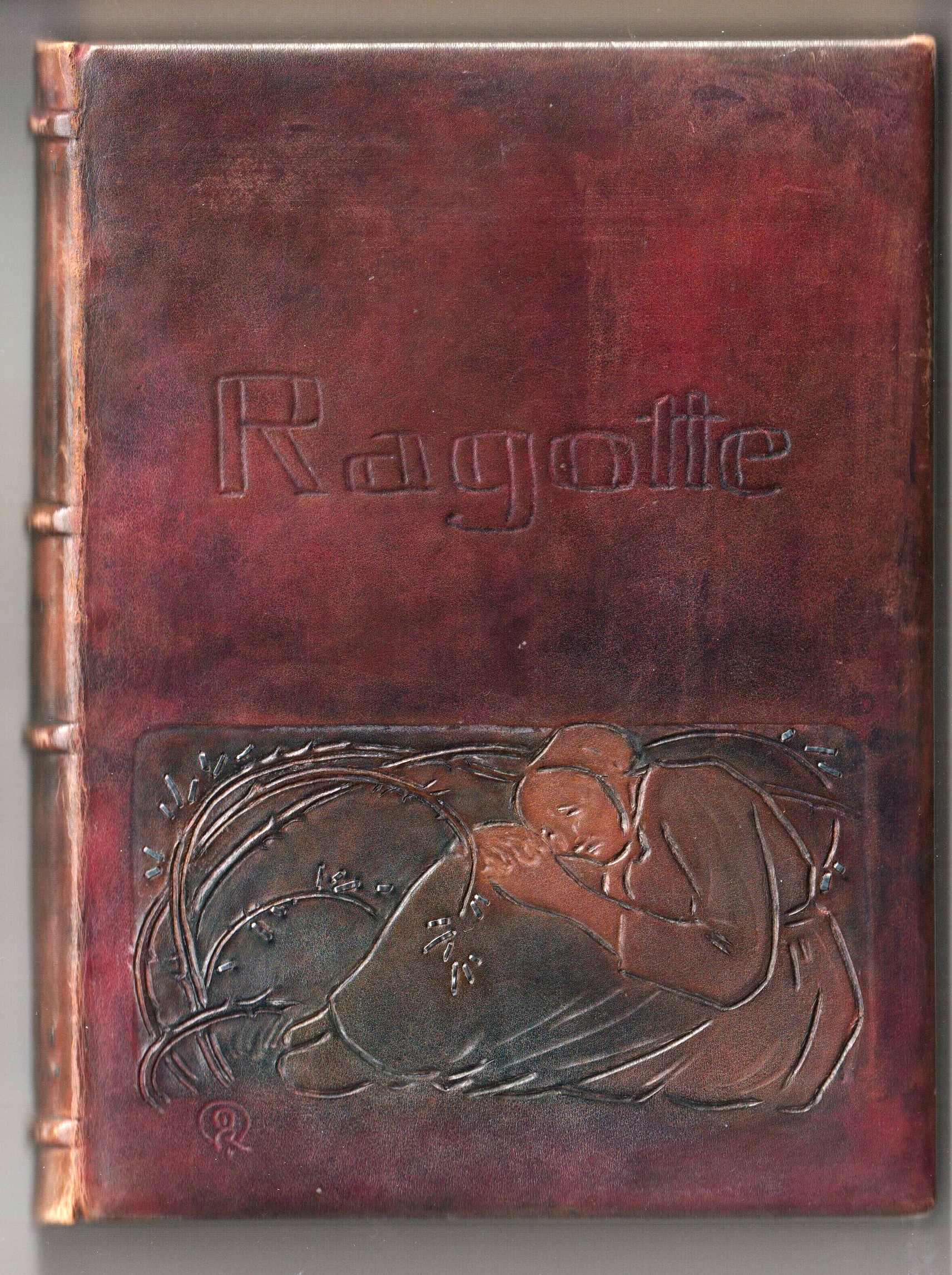
Jules Renard 1909 Ragotte

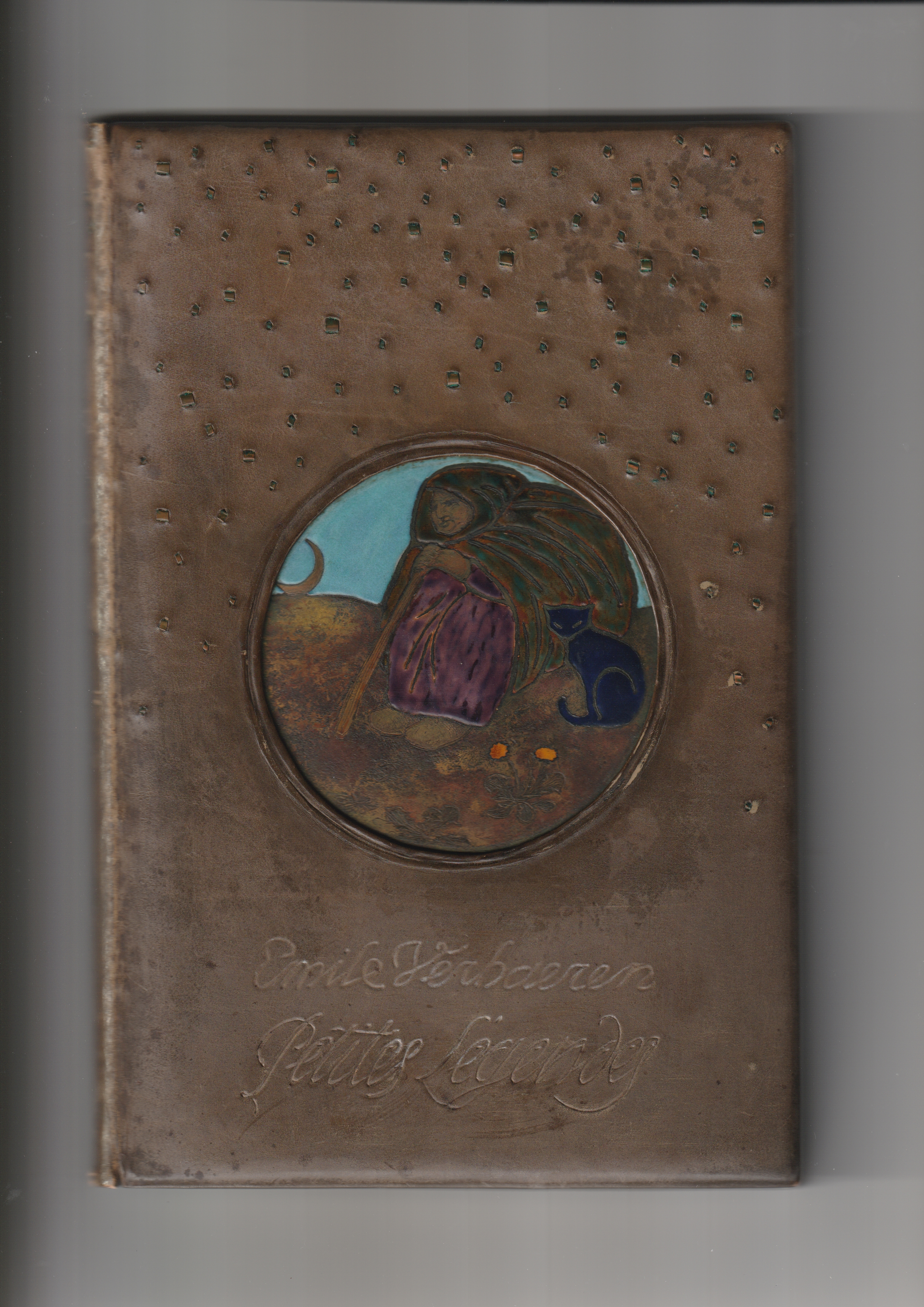
Eamels. Petites Légendes 1900

== Embroideries ==
Embroidery by Nori Malo-Renault

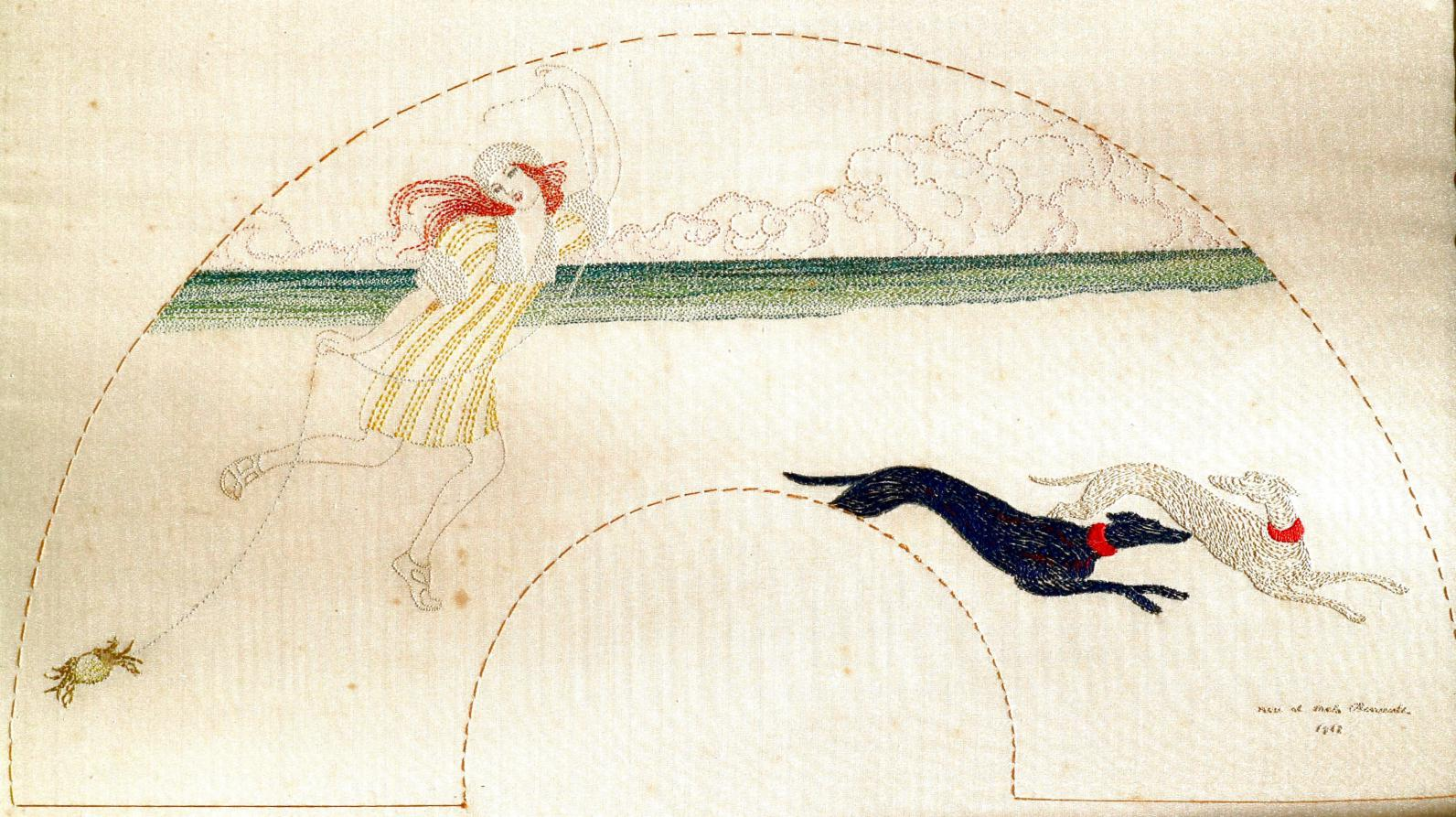
Greyhounds running on the beach (1948)

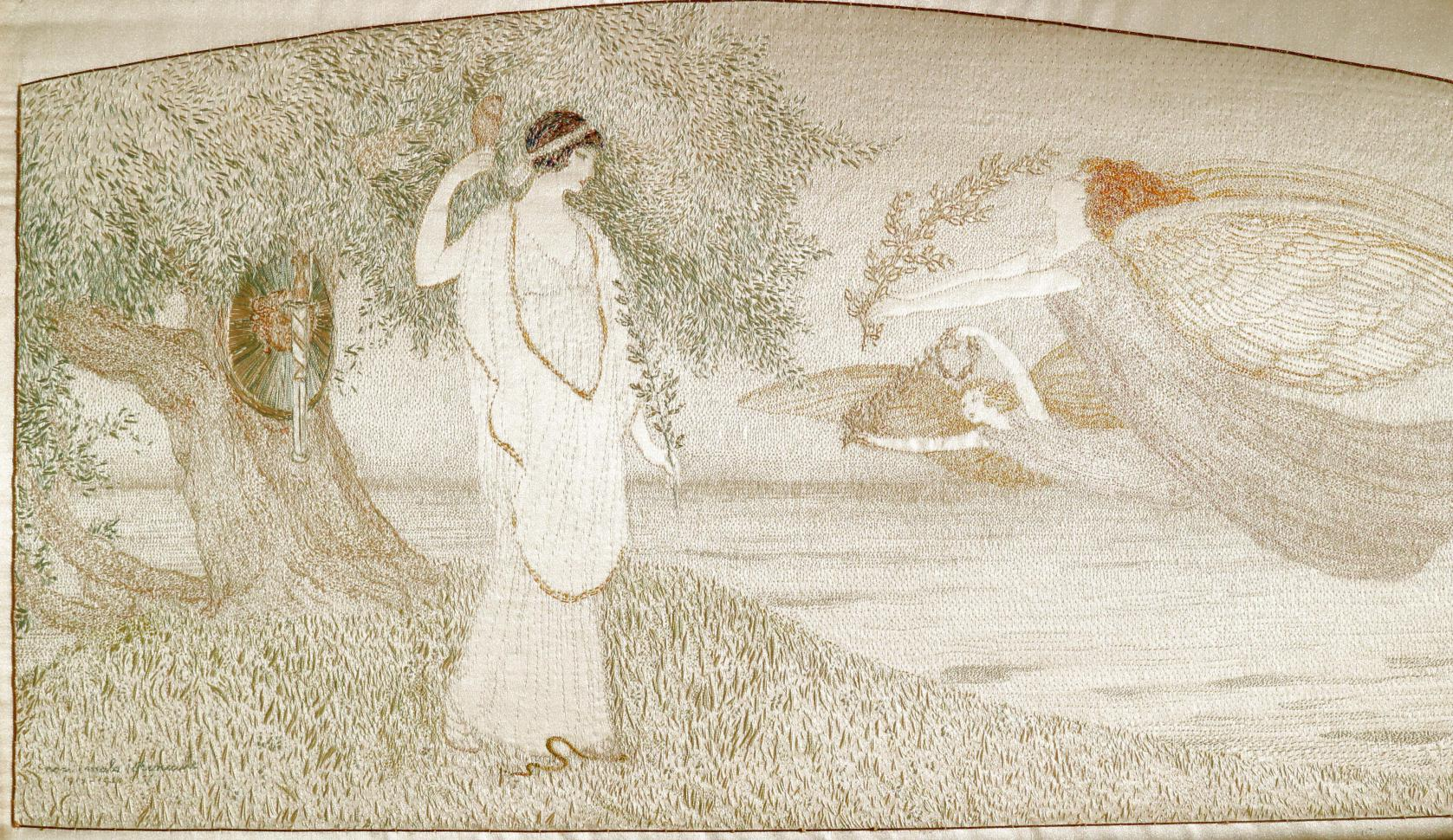
Minerva slaying the snake

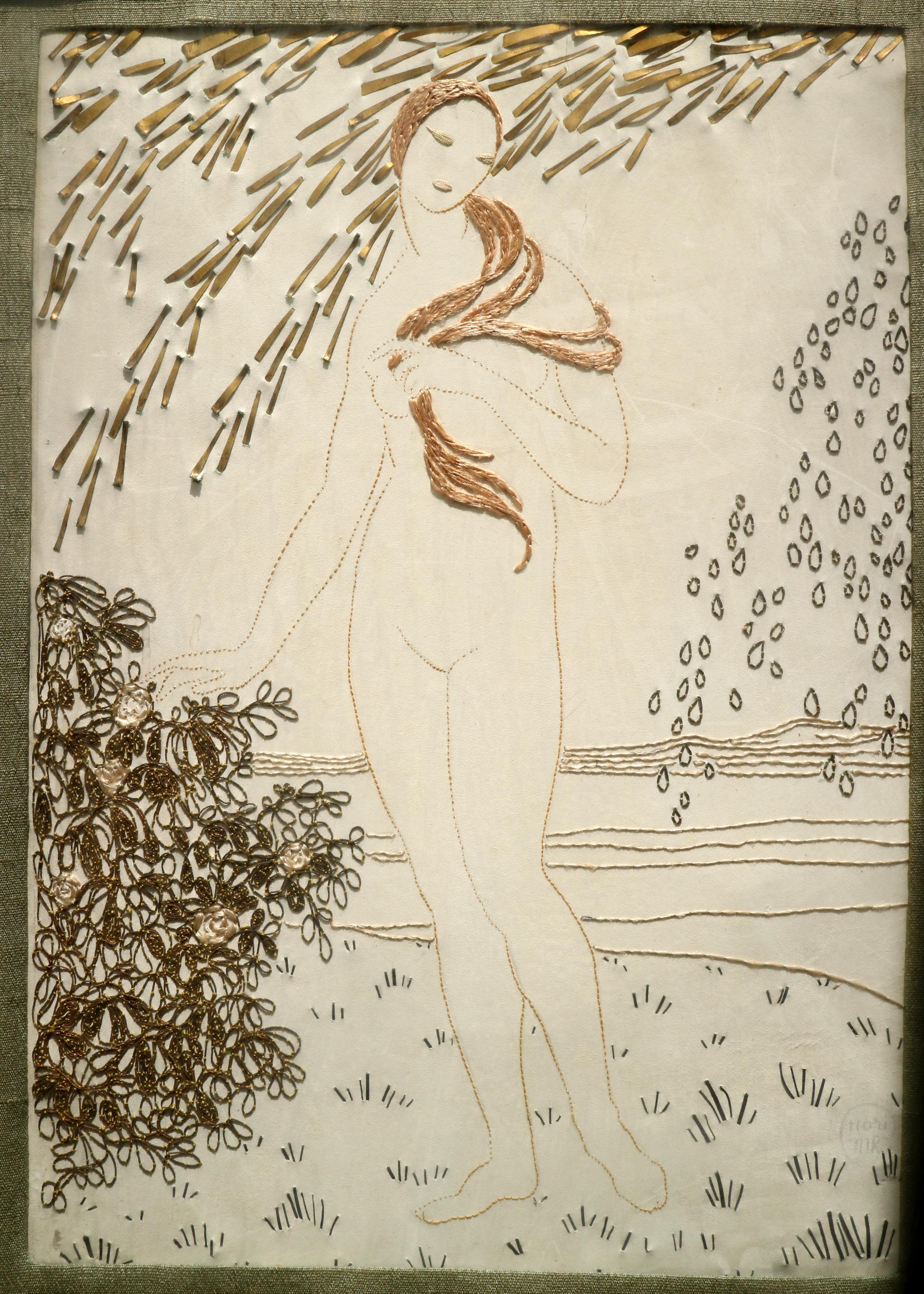
Broderie et lamé (1925)
- Deux lévriers sur la plage
- La déesse Minerve

== Public collections ==
London

- British Museum, Printed in full color of a print of her husband : little girl lying in bed, holding four dolls in her arms,

Paris

- Bibliothèque nationale de France, The Black Serpent by Paul Adam, ill. Malo-Renault and print on color by Nori Malo-Renault
- Manufacture de Sèvres : Bonbonnière, dessins décors à Sèvres entre 1920-1921 (art décoratif)
- Chalcography of the Louvre
  - Salomé, original print (3 copper plates)
  - La Femme au masque (5 copper plates)

Quimper

- Musée des Beaux-Arts de Quimper
  - Marie-Annick original etching
- Musée départemental Breton
  - Exlibris de Charles Le Goffic

Rennes

- Musée de Bretagne:
  - Les Petits dormeurs, au dos, inscription avec tampon encreur: imprimé par Nori Malo Renault
  - Salomé, eau-forte originale en couleur
  - Femme au masque avec plusieurs tirages de réglage (couleur)
  - Marie-Annick, eau-forte monochrome
  - Élégante buvant son thé, au dos, inscription avec tampon encreur: imprimé par Nori Malo Renault
