= Proto-Temotu language =

Reconstructed ancestor of the Temotu languages

Proto-Temotu
- PTm
- Reconstruction of: Temotu languages
- Region: Temotu Province
- Reconstructed ancestors: Proto-Austronesian: Proto-Malayo-Polynesian; Proto-Oceanic
- Lower-order reconstructions: Proto-Reefs – Santa Cruz; Proto-Utupua; Proto-Vanikoro

Proto-Temotu (abbreviated as PTm) is the reconstructed ancestor of the Temotu languages of Temotu Province, Solomon Islands. It belongs to the Oceanic branch of the Austronesian languages.

A partial reconstruction was done by Malcolm Ross and Åshild Næss in 2007, with further revisions by William James Lackey and Brenda H. Boerger in 2021.

== Descendants ==
Proto-Temotu diversified into three primary branches: Reefs – Santa Cruz, Utupua, and Vanikoro.

Originally, some linguists had proposed to group Utupua and Vanikoro languages under a single Utupua–Vanikoro subgroup, sometimes labelled “Eastern Outer Islands”. The unity of that subgroup has been however questioned by Lackey & Boerger (2021), who fail to identify shared phonological innovations for it.

== Innovations ==
Proto-Temotu was a phonologically conservative language in many respects, and was evidently an early descendant of Proto-Oceanic. For example, it retained Proto-Oceanic final consonants, as evidenced in the paragogic addition of a final vowel in the Vanikoro languages; it retained the contrast between *n and *ñ, based on an occasional Asumbuo reflex of y, reflecting a distinction lost in almost all other Oceanic languages; and many others; and it retained Proto-Oceanic *R as a distinct sound, evidenced by its occasional loss in daughter languages in contrast to *r and *l, which are usually never lost.

Nevertheless, Proto-Temotu can be defined by a handful of (admittedly weak) shared phonological innovations:

- Proto-Oceanic *l and *r merge as *l;
- Proto-Oceanic *s, *c, *j merge as *s;
- Lenition of Proto-Oceanic *q to a velar or uvular fricative, either [x] or [χ].

The small number of these shared innovations, and their weak diagnostic value, mean that the very existence of Proto-Temotu is still under debate: it is almost the same language as Proto-Oceanic itself, separated only by a few hundred years at most, as evidenced by the direct migration of Lapita peoples from the Bismarck Archipelago to the islands in present-day Temotu Province.

== Sample words ==
Words reconstructed for Proto-Temotu, according to Ross & Næss (2007), are:

- *amuk "mosquito" (< POc *ñamuk)
- *ima "hand" (< POc *lima)
- *li "five" (< POc *lima)
- *lu "two" (< POc *rua)
- *umʷaq "house" (< POc *Rumaq)

However, Lackey & Boerger (2021) consider some of Ross & Næss's reconstructions flawed, such as the word for "house". In Tanema, the word for "house" is nalama (na- being a fossilized article marker), showing a shift of *R > *l.
