= Utupua =

Island in Solomon Islands

Coordinates: 11°20′S 166°30′E

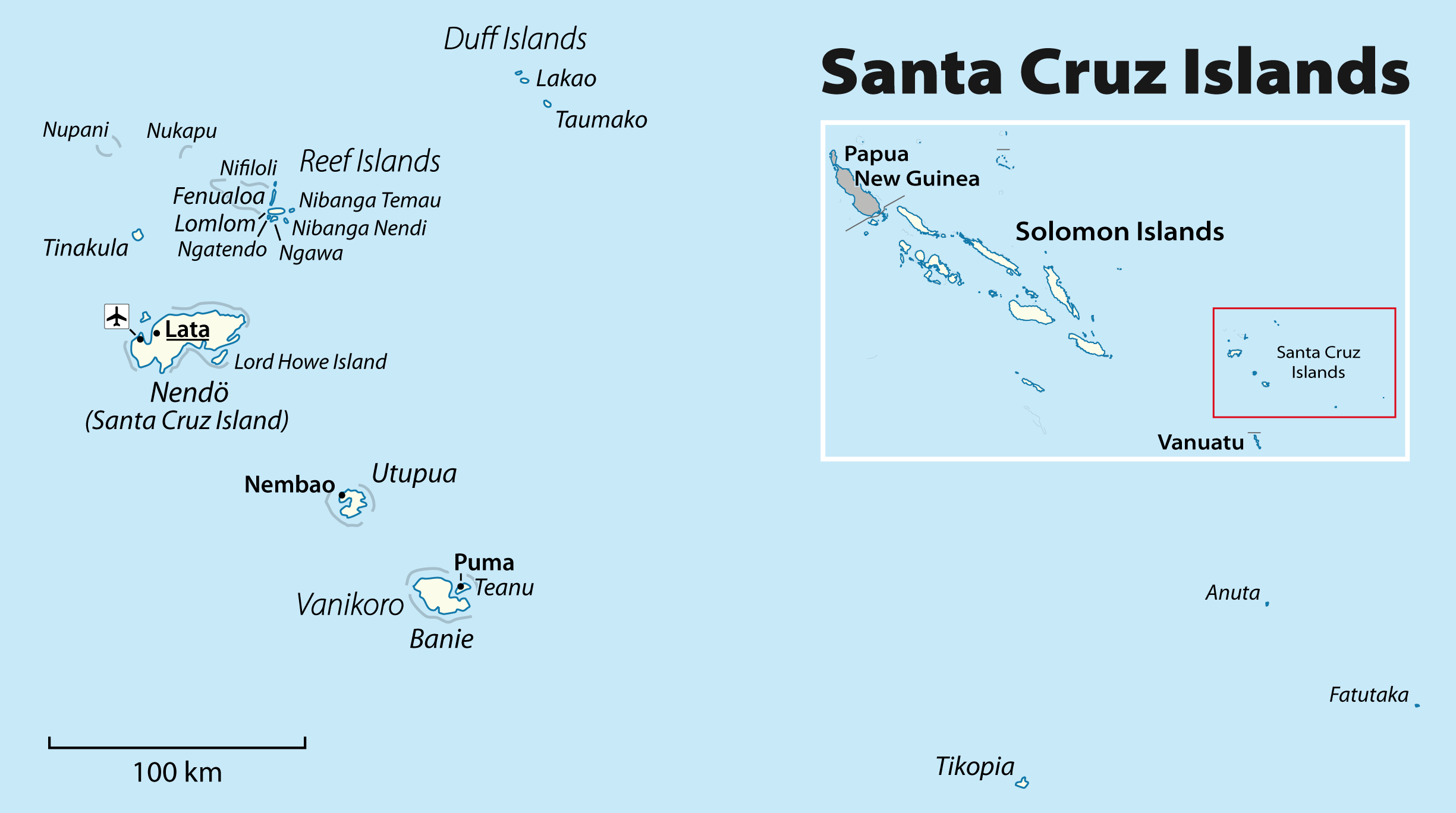

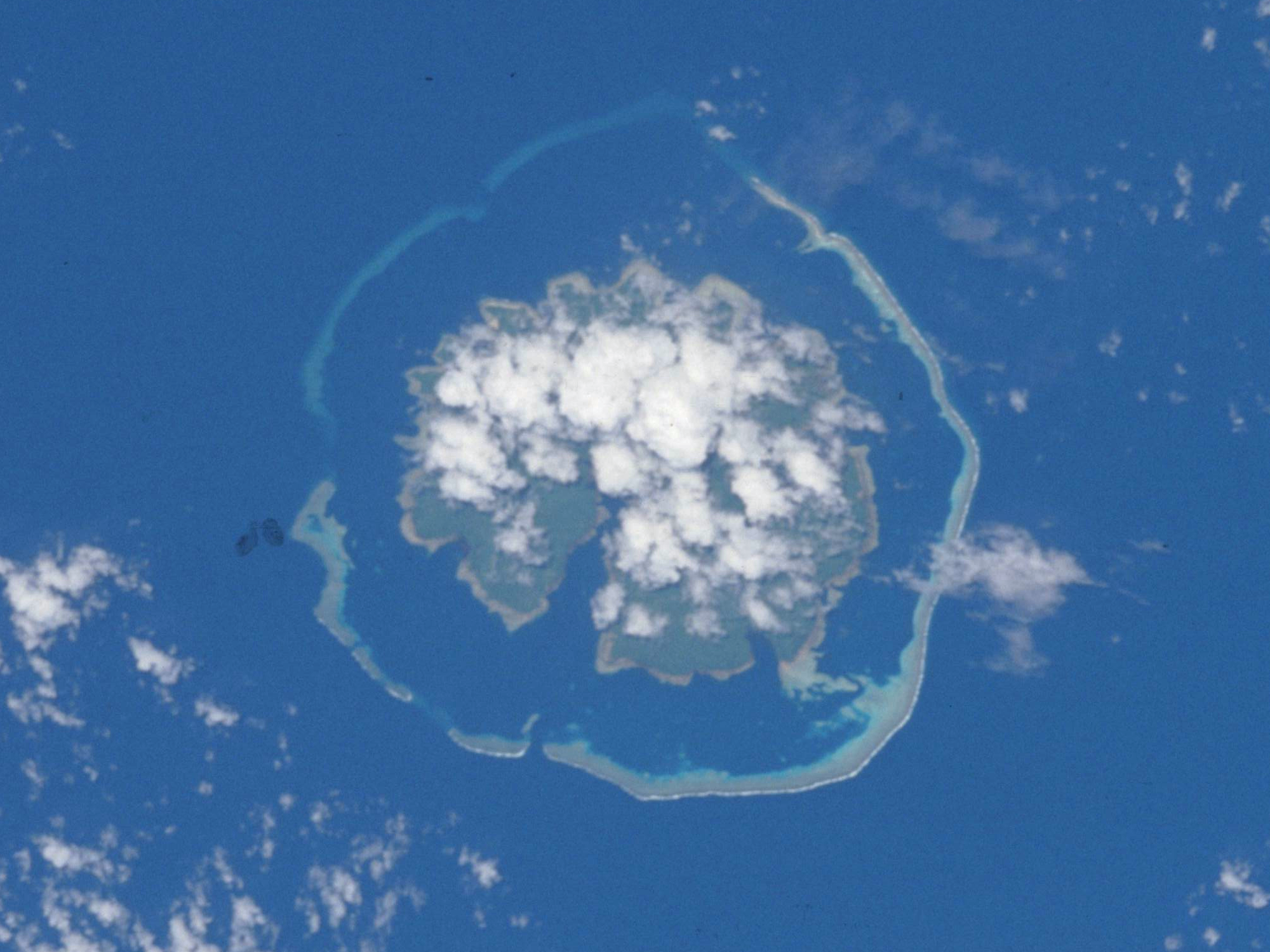
Utupua from space. Courtesy NASA

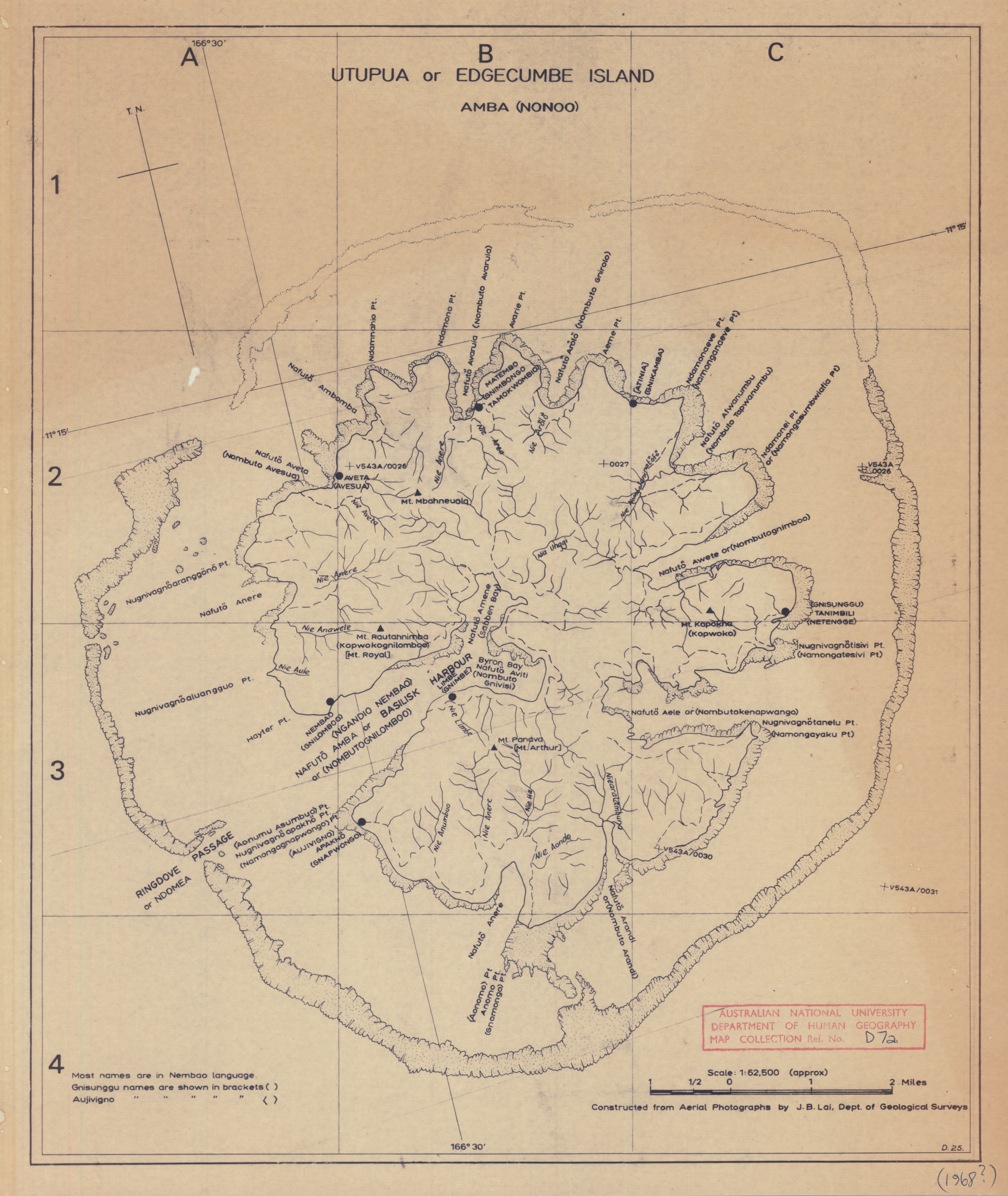
1968 map of Utupua Island

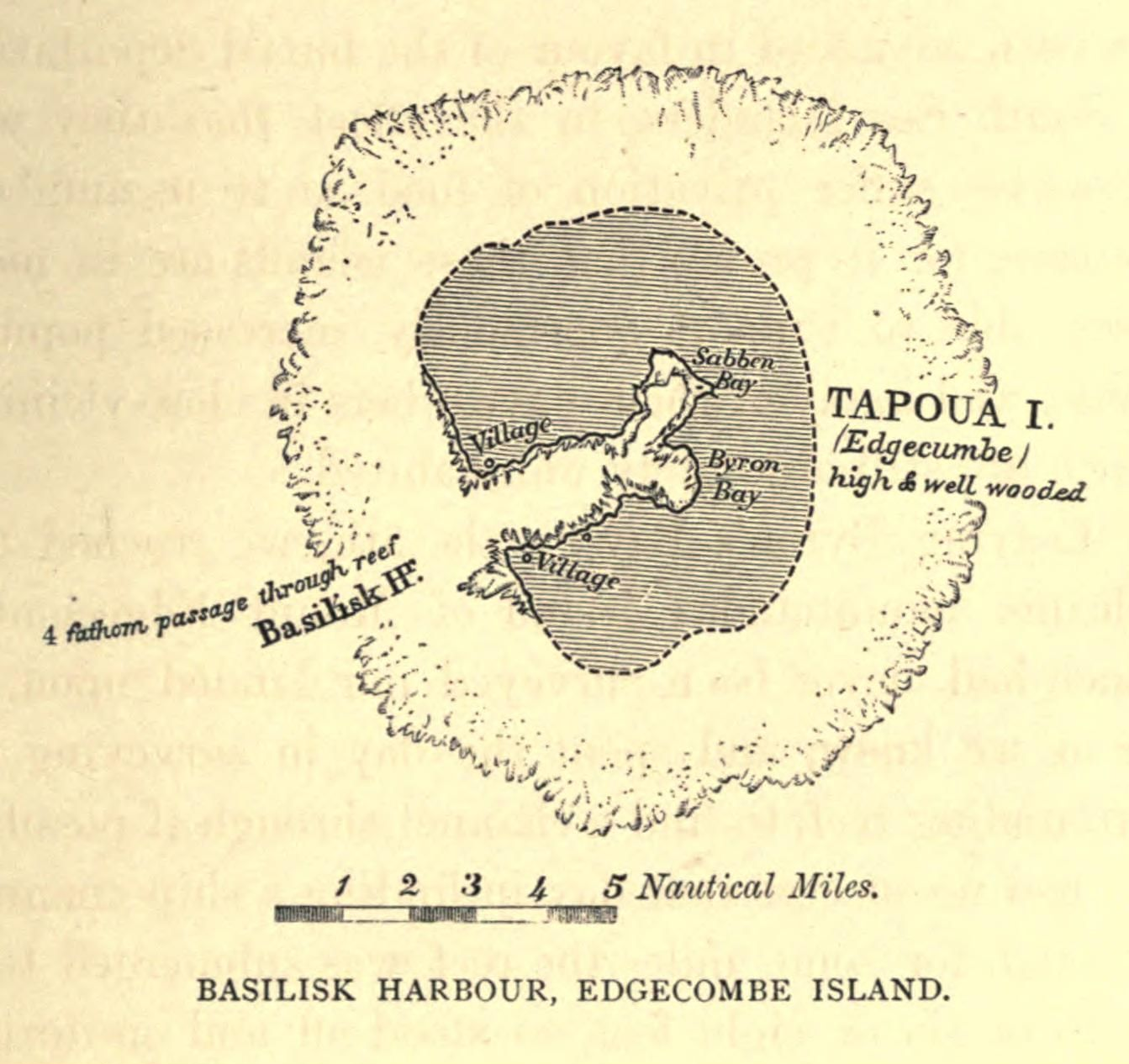
First map of Tapoua (1876)

Utupua is an island in the Santa Cruz Islands, located 66 km to the Southeast of the main Santa Cruz group, between Vanikoro and Santa Cruz proper (Nendö). This island belongs administratively to the Temotu Province of Solomon Islands.

== Geography ==
Utupua is a high u-shaped island surrounded by a coral reef. Its land surface is 69.0 square kilometres (26.6 square miles) and its highest point 380 metres (1,247 feet).

Utupua has a population of 848 inhabitants (1999 census) scattered in small villages. The main villages on the island are Avita, Malombo, Tanimbili, Apakho, and Nembao.

Utupua has a forested path that leads to viewpoints overlooking the coral reef that encloses the island.

== History ==
First sighting by Europeans was in September 1595 by the second Spanish expedition of Álvaro de Mendaña. More precisely it was sighted by Lorenzo Barreto while in command of one of the smaller vessels on a local voyage round the then called Santa Cruz, which is today's Nendö island.

== Society ==
=== Social practices ===
According to some observers, the society of Utupua functions without cash: islanders share their property instead of using a barter or money system.

In fact, Utupua islanders used to have a system of traditional money, in the form of feather money made with feathers of Myzomela cardinalis birds. That ceremonial money was mostly used for payment of the bride price. Since the 1980s, it has been replaced by cash.

=== Languages ===
Three Oceanic languages are spoken on Utupua:

- Amba, or Nembao
- Asumboa, or Asubuo
- Tanimbili, or Tanibili

Each language is associated with a distinct community, on different points of the island.
