= Pedro Fernandes de Queirós =

Portuguese navigator (1563–1614)

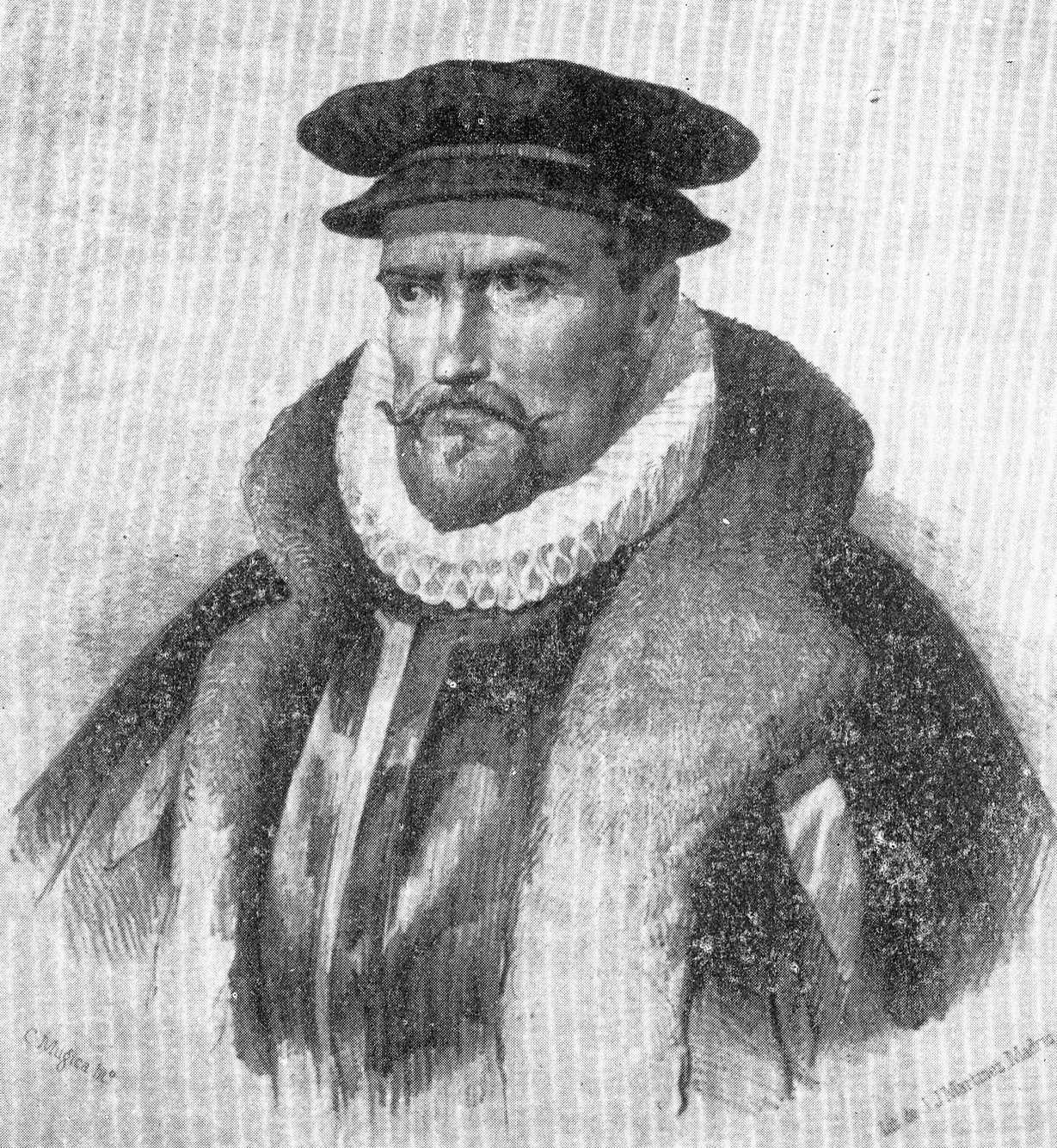
- Modern artist's impression of de Queirós
- Born: 1563; Évora, Kingdom of Portugal
- Died: 1614 (aged 50–51); Isthmus of Panama, Viceroyalty of Peru, Habsburg Spain
- Occupation: Navigator
- Known for: Spanish discovery of the Pacific Ocean
- Children: 1 son and daughter

Pedro Fernandes de Queirós (Spanish: Pedro Fernández de Quirós; 1563–1614) was a Portuguese navigator in the service of Spain. He is best known for leading several Spanish voyages of discovery in the Pacific Ocean, in particular the 1595–1596 voyage of Álvaro de Mendaña y Neira, and for the 1605–1606 expedition that crossed the Pacific in search of Terra Australis.

== Early life ==
Queirós (or Quirós as he signed) was born in Évora, Portugal in 1563. As the Portuguese and Spanish monarchies had been unified under the king of Spain in 1580 (following the vacancy of the Portuguese throne, which lasted for sixty years, until 1640, when the Portuguese monarchy was restored), Queirós entered Spanish service as a young man and became an experienced seaman and navigator.

In April 1595, he joined Álvaro de Mendaña y Neira on his voyage to colonize the Solomon Islands, serving as chief pilot. After Mendaña's death in October 1595, Queirós is credited with taking command and saving the only remaining ship of the expedition, arriving in the Philippines in February 1596. Isabel Barreto, Mendaña's wife, accompanied the expedition and was accused of causing the crew's low morale by her selfishness and strict discipline.

== The search for Terra Australis ==
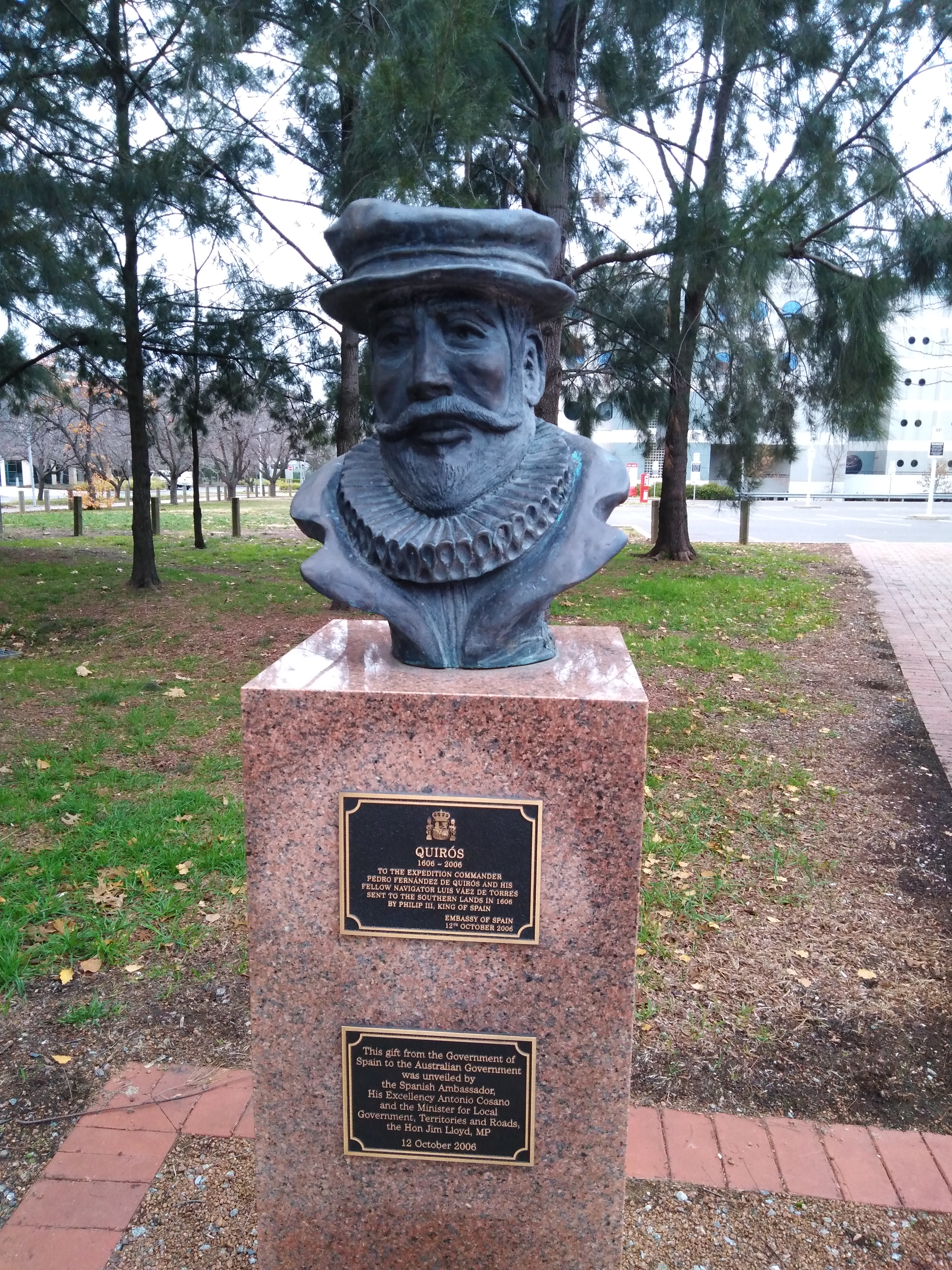
Sculpture in Canberra

Queirós spent eighteen months in the Philippines, but returned to Spain in 1598, via Mexico. Upon his return to Spain, he petitioned King Philip III to support another voyage into the Pacific, hoping to find a large southern continent to claim for Spain. A devout Catholic, Queirós also visited Rome in 1600, where he obtained the support of Pope Clement VIII, for further explorations. He greatly impressed the Spanish Ambassador in Rome, the Duke of Sesa, who described him as a “man of good judgement, experienced in his profession, hard working, quiet and disinterested.” While in Rome, Queirós also first wrote his Treatise on Navigation as a letter to the king, further reinforcing his reputation as a navigator, and invented two navigational tools.

In March 1603, Queirós was finally authorized to return to Peru to organize another expedition, with the intention of finding Terra Australis, the anticipated "great south land," and claiming it for Spain and the Catholic Church. Queirós was shipwrecked in the West Indies, but made it to Peru by March 1605. Queirós's party of 160 men on three ships, San Pedro y San Pablo (150 tons), San Pedro (120 tons), and the tender (or launch) Los Tres Reyes left Callao on 21 December 1605.

In January 1606, the expedition came upon Henderson Island and Ducie Island, and then Rakahanga (Northern Cook Islands), and the Buen Viaje Islands (Butaritari and Makin) in the present-day island nation of Kiribati. It is also probable that his expedition sighted Tahiti and other islands in the Tuamotu archipelago. Queirós narrowly missed the Marquesas as well as New Zealand, thanks to a change in his planned itinerary.

Spanish "Australia del Espíritu Santo".

In May 1606, the expedition reached the islands later called the New Hebrides and now known as the independent nation of Vanuatu. Queirós landed on a large island which he took to be part of the southern continent, and named it Australia del Espíritu Santo. In his printed memorials, notably the Eighth (which was published in Italy, Holland, France, Germany and England), this was altered to Austrialia del Espíritu Santo (The Australian Land of the Holy Spirit), a pun on "Austria", in honor of King Philip III, who was of the House of Hapsburg or 'Austria' in Spanish. The island is still called Espiritu Santo. Here, he stated his intention to establish a colony, to be called Nova Jerusalem. He seems to have identified Australia/Austrialia del Espíritu Santo with the huge northward extension of the Austral continent joining it to New Guinea, as depicted in maps like those of Gerard de Jode and Petrus Plancius. For, as he said in his Tenth Memorial (page 5): “New Guinea is the top end of the Austral Land of which I treat".

Queirós' religious fervour found expression with the founding of a new Order of Chivalry, the Knights of the Holy Ghost. The Order's purpose was to protect the new colony. However, within weeks the idea of a colony was abandoned due to the hostility of the Ni-Vanuatu and to disagreements among the crew.

After six weeks Queirós' ships put to sea to explore the coastline. On the night of 11 June 1606, Queirós in the San Pedro y San Pablo became separated from the other ships in bad weather and was unable (or so he later said) to return to safe anchorage at Espiritu Santo. In reality, the crew mutinied, with the unfavorable wind conditions just giving them an opportunity to do so. The captain on the San Pedro y San Pablo named Diego de Prado, aware of the crew's plans, had already transferred to Torres' ship, and so did the expedition's surgeon. Queirós' ship, with Queirós being held in his cabin, then sailed to Acapulco, Mexico, where she arrived in November 1606. In the account of Diego de Prado, which is highly critical of Queirós, mutiny and poor leadership is given as the reason for Queirós's disappearance.

Two weeks later, his second-in-command, Luis Váez de Torres, after searching in vain for Queirós and assuming Queirós (or rather the crew of his ship) had decided to go their own way, left Espiritu Santo. Torres successfully reached Manila, the capital of the Spanish East Indies in May 1607, after charting the southern coastline of New Guinea on the way and in doing so sailing through the strait that now bears his name, between Australia and New Guinea. Torres was unaware of his proximity to Australia's northern coast, just over the horizon from his route.

== Later life ==
Pedro Fernandes de Quirós returned to Madrid in 1607. Regarded as a crank, he spent the next seven years in poverty, writing numerous accounts of his voyage and begging King Philip III for money for a new voyage, sending the king more than 65 letters over a seven-year period. He was finally despatched to Peru with letters of support, but the king had no real intention of funding another expedition, as the royal council feared that Spain could not afford new discoveries in the Pacific. Quirós died on the way, in Panama, in 1614. He had married Doña Ana Chacón de Miranda of Madrid in 1589; the couple had one son and one daughter. His son Lucas de Quirós, who participated in the 1605 expedition, was knighted an Alférez Real and became a regarded cosmographer in Lima.

== Accounts of Queirós's voyage ==
There are a number of documents describing the Queirós – Torres voyages still in existence. Most significant are

- Queirós' many subsequent Memorials to the King Philip III regarding the voyage,
- Torres' letter to the King of Spain from 12 July 1607,
- Diego de Prado's narrative and 4 charts of New Guinea,
- Juan Luis Arias de Loyola's memorial to King Philip IV (written about 1630 and based on discussions between Queirós and Loyola).

1617 may be the date of the first English translation of one of Queirós’ memorials, as Terra Australis Incognita, or A New Southerne Discoverie. A short account of Queirós’ voyage and discoveries was published in English by Samuel Purchas in 1625 in Haklvytvs posthumus, or, Pvrchas his Pilgrimes, vol. iv, p. 1422-1432. This account also appears to be based on a letter by Queirós to the King in 1610, the eighth on the matter.

Some time between 1762 and 1765, written accounts of the Queirós-Torres expedition were seen by British Admiralty Hydrographer Alexander Dalrymple. Dalrymple provided a sketch map which included the Queirós-Torres voyages to Joseph Banks who undoubtedly passed this information to James Cook.

=== Memorials ===
Queirós sent at least 50, possibly 65, memorials to the King between 1607 and 1614. Although most were written manuscripts, Queirós paid to have fourteen printed and presented to the King. Copies of thirteen of these memorials are known to have survived. Scholars have numbered these memorials in different ways according to the memorials available to them for study, and those publicly known at the time. 1617 may be the date of the first English translation of one of Queirós's memorials, as Terra Australis Incognita, or A New Southerne Discoverie. A short account of Queirós's voyage and discoveries was published in English by Samuel Purchas in 1625 in Haklvytvs posthumus, or, Pvrchas his Pilgrimes, vol. iv, p. 1422-1432. This account also appears to be based on a letter by Queirós to the King in 1610, the eighth on the matter.

The table below gives a summary of the memorials, including the classification systems used by four different scholars: Celsus Kelly in 1965, Frances Mary Hellessey Dunn in 1961, Justo Zaragoza in 1876 and Phyllis Mander-Jones in 1930.

Title	Date	Dunn	Kelly	Zaragoza	Mander-Jones	Notes
Señor : PEDRO Fernandez Quiros digo: Que gouernãdo el Peru el Marques de Cañete el año de 1595...	December 1607	1607A	552	I	Z1	In his memorial of February 1608, Queirós refers to a memorial sent in December 1607. A surviving copy of this memorial was sold by a private collector in 2019.
Señor : el capitan Pedro Fernandez de Quiros, digo : que para descubrir la parte incognita del Sur ...	February–March 1608		554			Queirós here describes his 1605-1606 expedition and lists some requirements for establishing a settlement.
Señor : el capitan Pedro Fernandez de Quiròs : despues q puse en pratica el descubrimiento de las tierras incognitas del Sur ...	August 1608	1609F	564			In this memorial Queirós responds to five objections against establishing a settlement on Terra Australis.
Senor : el capitan Pedro Fernandez de Quiros, que por mãdado de V. M. ...	November 1608		569			In this memorial Queirós gives five reasons for establishing a settlement on Terra Australis.
Señor : el capitan Pedro Fernandez de Quiros, con este son ocho los memoriales que a V.M. he presentado en razon de las poblacion q se deue hazer en las tierras que V.M. mandò que descubriesse en la parte Austral incognita ...	December 1608-January 1609	1609A	573	K	Z2	Queirós describes the lands he visited on his expeditions and the peoples he encountered.
Señor : ya he dicho a V. Magestad que de la parte del Sur, esta oculta la quarta parte del globo ...	January 1609	1609B	612	L	Z3	Queirós here describes the other islands in the region.
Señor : el capitan Pedro Fernandez de Quiros : suplico a V.M. sea seruido ...	1609	1609E	644			Queirós compares his voyages and suggested settlement on Terra Australis with the Spanish colonization of the Americas.
Señor : el capitan Pedro Fernandez de Quiros : de mostrar V.M. al mundo, quanto dessea, y procura la mas honra y gloria de Dios nuestro señor, en la poblacion que V.M. mãda q yo vaya a hazer, en las tierras q de la parte Austral por orden de V.M. descubri ...	January 1610	1610A	653	P		This memorial was the first to be translated into other languages, after it was distributed beyond the Spanish court. In it, Queirós asks for further resources and also asks for a grant of money as he now lives in poverty.
Señor : el capitan Pedro Fernádez de Quiros : de mostrar V.M. al mundo, quanto dessea, y procura la mas honra y gloria de Dios nuestro señor, en la poblacion que V.M. mãda q yo vaya a hazer, en las tierras q de la parte Austral por orden de V.M. descubri ...	February–March 1610	1610A	654		Z6	Queirós explains how the 500,000 ducats required for the expedition will be spent, and describes the preparations for his earlier expedition.
Señor : el Capitan Pedro Fernandez de Quiros : V.M. ordena y manda a su Consejo de Indias que me despachos a mi satisfacion para que el Virrey del Piru me de lo que fuere menester a la poblacion de las tierras Australes adonde V.M. se sirue mandarme ir.	October 1610	1610B	667/77	Q	Z7	In this memorial Queirós summarises the previous memorials and repeats his request for funding.
Señor : el capitan Pedro Fernandez de Quiros : cincuenta meses ha que estoy en esta Corte, suplicande a V.M. se sirua mandar me vaya a poblar las tierras que V.M. me mandò descubrir.	November–December 1611	1611	709	S	Z8	Queirós complains that he has now spent over four years at court waiting for permission and funding for his expedition.
Señor : el capitan Pedro Fernandez de Quiros : la parte incognita Austral es justamente quarta del Globo, sin saberse si es tierra, o si es agua, o que partes tiene de las dos ...	1612	1612A	711		A1	Queirós, having been told by the King to wait for a year, notes that this time has now elapsed and outlines his plans again.
Señor : capitan Pedro Fernandez de Quiros : V. Wagestad me mandò despachar dos vezes, la sequnda a mi satisfacion, juntamente esperar un año y son passados casi dos ...	January 1613	1612B	732			In this memorial Queirós complains that he has now spent six years waiting at court. He outlines different ideas for funding the expedition and begs the King to consider them.
Señor : el capitan Pedro Fernandez de Quiros, a V.M. pido licencia para quexarme ...	1614					Queirós continues to express his frustration at the King's failure to respond to his requests. This is the last known printed memorial.

== Theory that Queirós discovered Australia ==
In the 19th century, some Australians claimed that Queirós had in fact discovered Australia in advance of Willem Janszoon, Abel Tasman, and James Cook. The Catholic Archbishop of Sydney from 1884 to 1911, Patrick Francis Moran, asserted this to be a fact, and it was taught in Australian Catholic schools for many years. Moran claimed that the real site of Queirós' New Jerusalem was near Gladstone in Queensland, supported by elements of Queirós' description of the land he had discovered, such as his assertion that "its length is as much as all Europe and Asia Minor as far as the Caspian and Persia, with all the islands of the Mediterranean and the ocean which encompasses, including the two islands of England and Ireland. That hidden part is the fourth corner of the world".

== Queirós in modern literature ==
Captain Quiros

Bitter indeed the chalice that he drank
For no man's pride accepts so cheap a rate
As not to call on Heaven to vindicate
His worth together with the cause he served.

— James McAuley, 1964

The Australian poet James McAuley wrote an epic poem called Captain Quiros (1964), describing the expeditions of Queirós in his search for the Great South Land. It is considered an important contribution to the voyager theme in Australian literature.

The Australian writer John Toohey published a novel, Quiros, in 2002.

The British writer Robert Graves describes the 1595 expedition in his historical novel, The Islands of Unwisdom, published in 1949.

== Namesake ==
The Spanish Navy gunboat Quirós, commissioned in 1896, was named for Queirós, using the Spanish form of his surname. After she was sold to the United States, she retained the name as USS Quiros in United States Navy service from 1900 to 1923.

== In popular culture ==
Queirós was the subject of the 1982 television opera, Quiros, by Australian composer Peter Sculthorpe. Sculthorpe later reworked the opera into the 2013 oratorio The Great South Land, premiered at the Canberra International Music Festival.

Queirós is mentioned in the 1976 movie King Kong as discovering Skull Island and encountering Kong after being blown south from Tematagi in 1605.

Queirós is the namesake of many space stations in the 2014 video game Elite Dangerous.

== Bibliography ==
- Beaglehole, J. C. (1966). The Exploration of the Pacific (3rd ed.). Stanford University Press. pp. 58–107.
- Howgego, Raymond John, ed. (2003). "Quiros, Pedro Fernandes de". Encyclopedia of Exploration to 1800. Hordern House. ISBN 1875567364.
- Kelly, Celsus (1966), La Austrialia del Espíritu Santo: the journal of Fray Martin de Munilla, O.F.M., and other documents relating to the voyage of Pedro Fernández de Quirós to the South Sea (1605-1606) and the Franciscan Missionary Plan (1617-1627), Cambridge, published by the Hakluyt Society at Cambridge University Press, (Works issued by the Hakluyt Society, 2nd ser., no. 126–127).
- Spate, O. H. K. (1979). The Spanish Lake. Canberra: Australian National University Press. ISBN 0-7081-0727-3.
