= Malo (Solomon Islands) =

Small island in Solomon Islands, south-west Pacific

Coordinates: 10.655°S 165.691°E

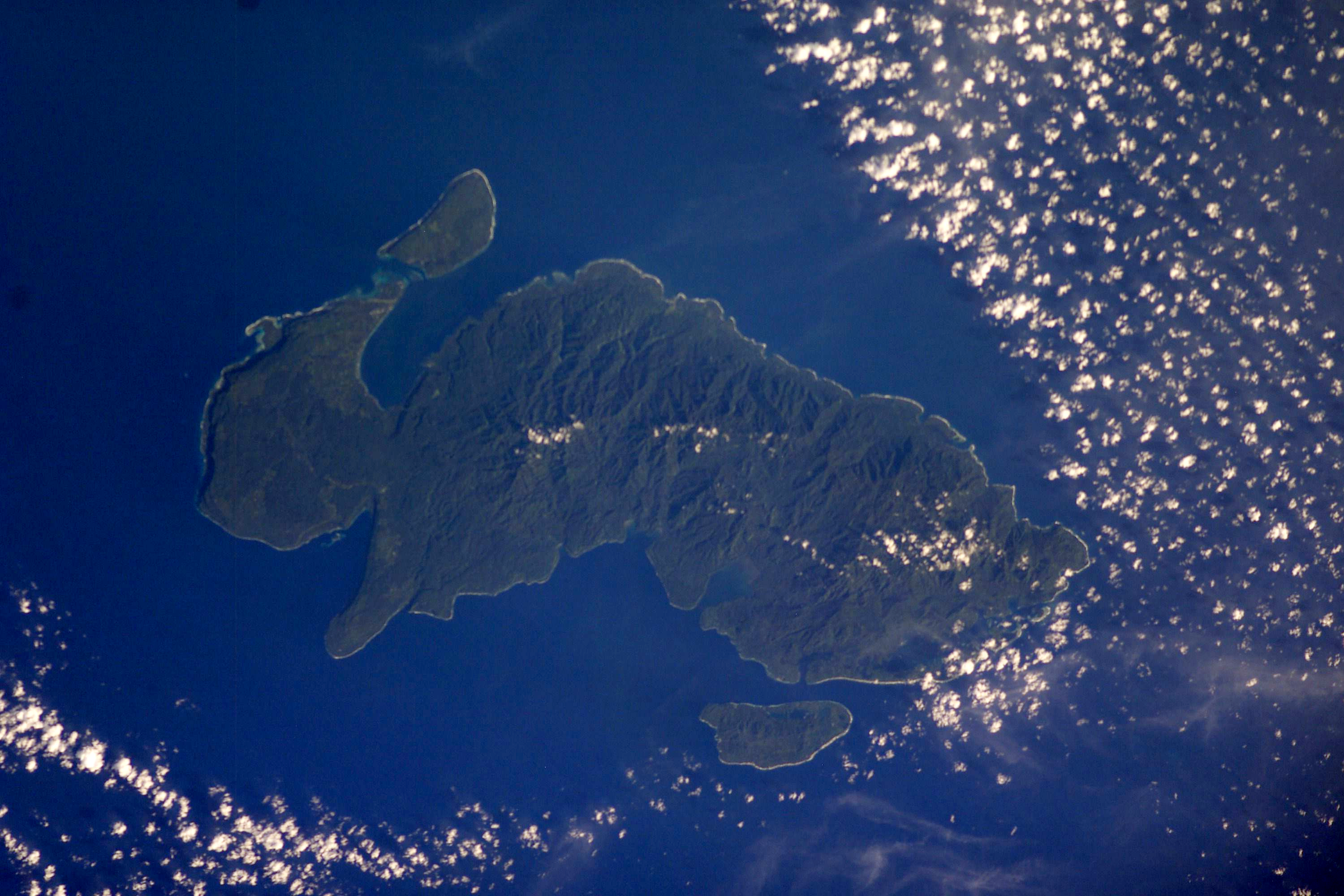
Malo is to the northwest of Nendö Island

Malo (also known as Temotu Neo) is an island in Temotu Province, Solomon Islands. The large neighbouring island is Nendö.

== Environment ==
Malo, along with neighbouring Nendö, has been identified by BirdLife International as an Important Bird Area (IBA) because it supports a population of the endemic Santa Cruz shrikebills, also known as the Nendo Shrikebill. Potential threats to the site come from logging and cyclones.
