= Temotu languages =

Group of Oceanic languages of the eastern Solomon Islands

Temotu
- Geographic distribution: Solomon Islands
- Linguistic classification: Austronesian: Malayo-Polynesian; Oceanic; Temotu
- Proto-language: Proto-Temotu
- Subdivisions: Reefs–Santa Cruz; Utupua; Vanikoro

Language codes
- Glottolog: temo1244
- Temotu

The Temotu languages, named after Temotu Province of the Solomon Islands, are a branch of Oceanic languages proposed in Ross & Næss (2007) to unify the Reefs – Santa Cruz languages with Utupua and Vanikoro, each a group of three related languages.

Utupua and Vanikoro were formerly classified together as the Utupua–Vanikoro languages or Eastern Outer Islands languages (see Proto-Temotu language § Descendants).

== History of classification ==
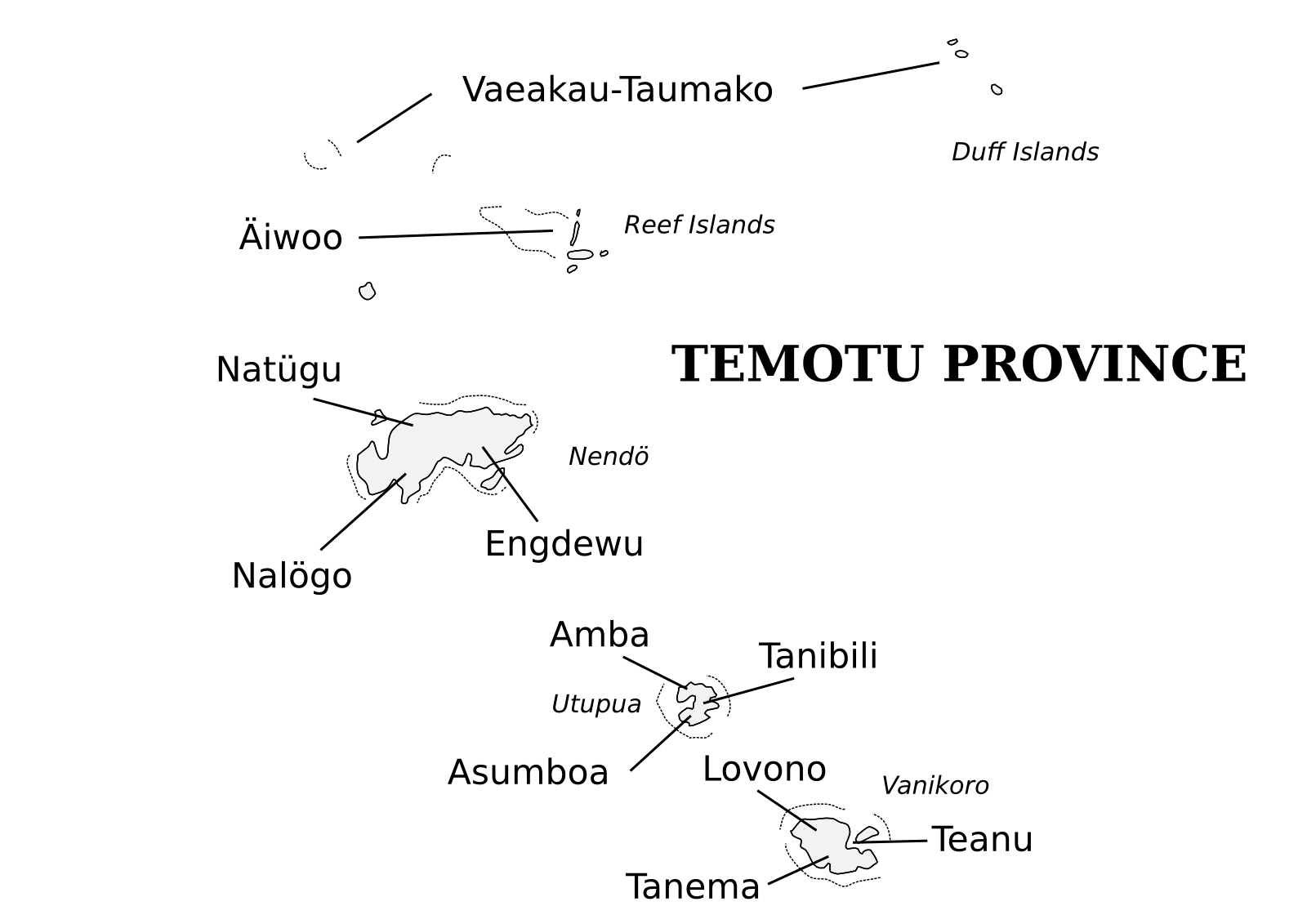
Map showing the ten languages of the Temotu group, plus the Polynesian language Vaeakau-Taumako.

The Reefs-Santa Cruz languages had previously been considered Papuan, but Ross & Næss (2007) established that their closest relatives were the Utupua–Vanikoro languages, previously thought to be Central–Eastern Oceanic. However, Roger Blench (2014) argues that the aberrancy of Utupua and Vanikoro, which he considers to be separate branches that do not group with each other, is due to the fact that they are actually non-Austronesian languages.

Blench (2014) doubts that Utupua and Vanikoro are closely related, and argues that thus they should not be grouped together. Since each of the three Utupua and three Vanikoro languages are highly distinct from each other, Blench doubts that these languages had diversified on the islands of Utupua and Vanikoro, but had rather migrated to the islands from elsewhere. According to Blench, historically this was due to the Lapita demographic expansion consisting of both Austronesian and non-Austronesian settlers migrating from the Lapita homeland in the Bismarck Archipelago to various islands further to the east.

More recently, Lackey & Boerger (2021) find no phonological evidence for an Utupua-Vanikoro subgroup, suggesting that they actually consist of two primary branches.

== Languages ==
- Reef Islands–Santa Cruz: Äiwoo, Nanggu, Natügu, Nalögo, Noipä
- Utupua: Amba, Asumboa, Tanimbili
- Vanikoro: Teanu, Lovono, Tanema

François (2009) notes that the lexicons of all three Vanikoro languages are highly distinct from each other and do not appear to be closely related, although their grammars are all similar.
