= Asumbuo language =

Endangered language of Solomon Islands

Asumboa
- Asubuo
- Native to: Solomon Islands
- Region: Utupua
- Native speakers: (10 cited 1999)
- Language family: Austronesian: Malayo-Polynesian; Oceanic; Temotu; Utupua; Asumboa

Language codes
- ISO 639-3: aua
- Glottolog: asum1237
- ELP: Asumboa
- Asumbuo is classified as Severely Endangered by the UNESCO Atlas of the World's Languages in Danger.

Asumbuo (Asubuo in local orthography; Asumboa or Asuboa in some sources) is a nearly extinct language spoken on the island of Utupua, in the easternmost province of the Solomon Islands.

== Affiliation ==
Like the two other languages of Utupua (Tanimbili and Amba), Asumbuo belongs to the Temotu subgroup of the Oceanic family, itself part of the Austronesian phylum.

== Language vitality ==
With only about 10 speakers, Asumbuo is a highly endangered language. Together with its neighbour Tanimbili, it is currently being replaced by Amba (or Nebao), the main language of Utupua.

== Bibliography ==
- Tryon, Darrell (1994). "Language contact and contact-induced language change in the Eastern Outer Islands, Solomon Islands". In Tom Dutton; Darrell Tryon (eds.). Language Contact and Change in the Austronesian World. Berlin: Mouton de Gruyter. pp. 611–648. ISBN 978-3-11-088309-1..
