= Temotu Noi =

Island in Temotu Province, Solomon Islands

Coordinates: 10.809°S 166.061°E

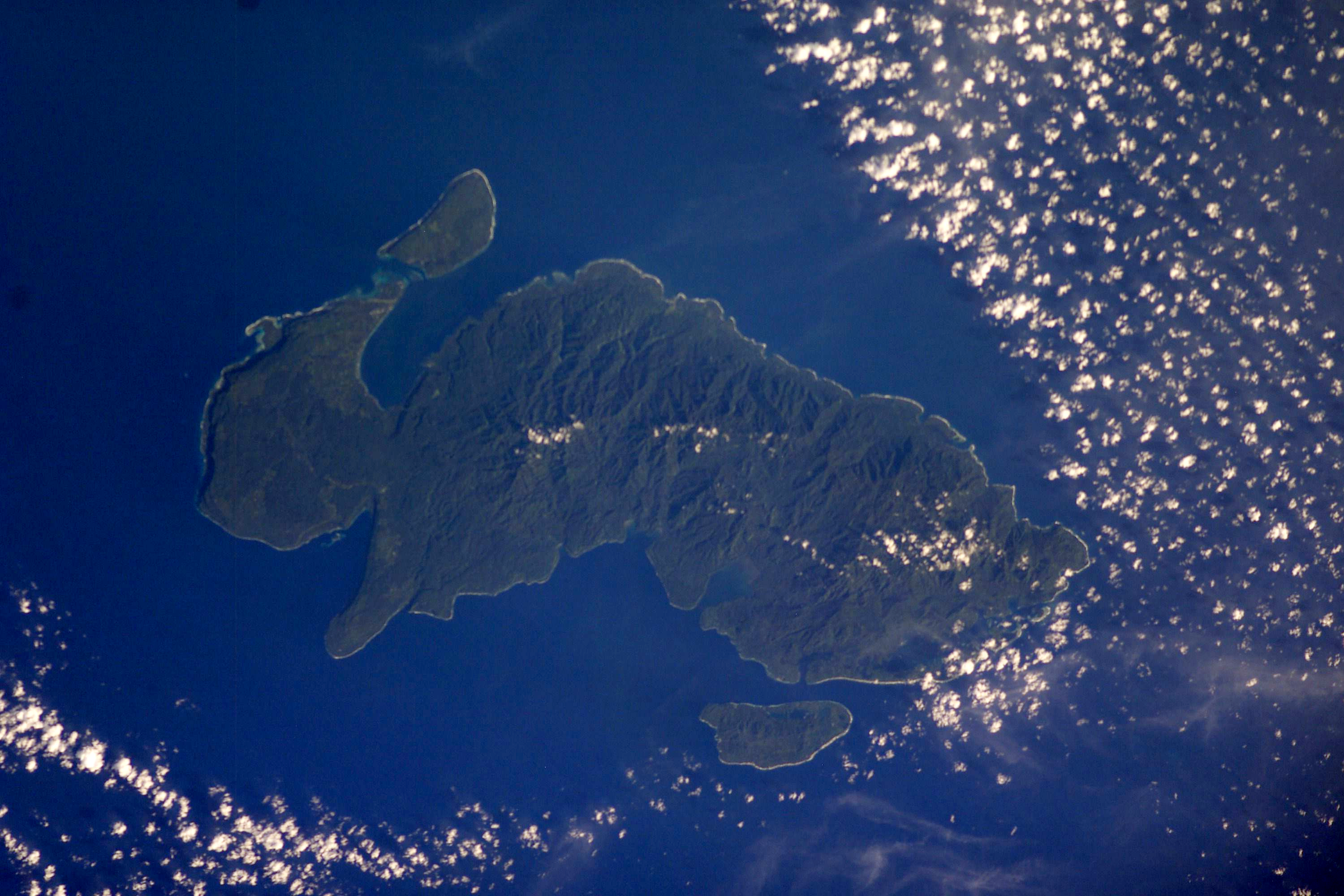
Nibanga is to the southeast of Nendö Island

Temotu Noi (also known as Nibanga) is one of the Santa Cruz Islands, in Temotu Province, Solomon Islands. The island has a crocodile-infested freshwater lake. The island lies to the southeast of the neighboring Nendö Island.
