= Nanggu language =

Oceanic language spoken in Solomon Islands

Engdewu
- Nanggu
- Native to: Solomon Islands
- Region: Nendo Island
- Native speakers: (210 cited 1999)
- Language family: Austronesian: Malayo-Polynesian; Oceanic; Temotu ?; Reefs – Santa Cruz; Engdewu

Language codes
- ISO 639-3: ngr
- Glottolog: nang1262
- ELP: Nagu
- Coordinates: 10°45′30″S 165°56′49″E

Engdewu, also known as Nanggu or Nagu, is an Oceanic language of the Solomon Islands. Along with Natügu and Nalögo, Engdewu is one of three Reefs – Santa Cruz languages spoken on the island of Nendö or Santa Cruz.

== Names ==
The language used to be known by outsiders as Nanggu (Engdewu pronunciation: [naᵑɡu]), from the name of one of the villages where it is still spoken. This name is also spelled Nangu or Nagu.

The local population prefers to name the language Engdewu, after the name of the ancient village where it was initially spoken. This name has now been adopted by linguists.

== Grammar ==
A description of the language was produced in 2013 by linguist Anders Vaa.

== Phonology ==
=== Consonants ===
Nanggu has 14 phonemic consonants.

		Labial	Alveolar	Alveolo- palatal	Palatal	Velar
Plosive	Voiceless	p	t			k
Plosive	Voiced	b	d			g
Fricative		β		s		
Nasal		m	n			ŋ
Approximant		w	l		j	

Vaa (2013) consistently uses /s/ and [s], which he describes as "lamino-palatoalveolar."

=== Vowels ===
Nanggu has ten phonemic vowels.

	Front	Central	Back
Close	i	ʉ	u
Close-mid	e	ɵ	
Open-Mid	ɛ	ɞ	ɔ
Open	a		ɒ
