= Amba language (Solomon Islands) =

One of the three Oceanic languages of Utupua (Solomon Islands)

Amba
- Aba
- Native to: Solomon Islands
- Region: Utupua
- Native speakers: (590 cited 1999)
- Language family: Austronesian: Malayo-Polynesian; Oceanic; Temotu; Utupua; Amba

Language codes
- ISO 639-3: utp
- Glottolog: amba1266
- Amba is not endangered according to the classification system of the UNESCO Atlas of the World's Languages in Danger

Amba (also known as Aba, Nembao or Nebao) is the main language spoken on the island of Utupua, in the easternmost province of the Solomon Islands.

== Name ==
The speaker population calls their own language [aᵐba] (with prenasalised [ᵐb]). This name may be rendered Amba or Aba depending on spelling conventions, which have not been fixed yet for these languages.

Speakers of neighbouring Asumboa designate the Amba language as [neᵐbao]. This form, which may be spelled Nembao or Nebao, has sometimes been used by foreigners as another name for the Amba language.

== Bibliography ==
- Tryon, Darrell (1994). "Language contact and contact-induced language change in the Eastern Outer Islands, Solomon Islands". In Tom Dutton; Darrell Tryon (eds.). Language Contact and Change in the Austronesian World. Berlin: Mouton de Gruyter. pp. 611–648. ISBN 978-3-11-088309-1..
