= Isabel Barreto =

Spanish sailor, traveler, and admiral

Isabel Barreto de Castro (Pontevedra, Galicia, Spain), (c. 1567 – 1612) was a Spanish sailor and traveler, one of the earliest known woman to hold the office of admiral in history. She was purportedly the granddaughter of Francisco Barreto, governor of Portuguese India. Isabel Barreto married Alvaro de Mendaña, Spanish navigator, patron of several expeditions to the Pacific Ocean, and European discoverer of the Solomon Islands and the Marquesas Islands.

== Life ==
Isabel accompanied her spouse on his last expedition from Peru to the Pacific. In the Santa Cruz Islands, she replaced Mendaña and her brother, Lorenzo Barreto, as Adelantada and Governor after their death. She and the main pilot Pedro Fernández de Quirós arrived at Manila, in the Philippines, with the 100 survivors of the expedition in the only remaining ship (at the beginning 378 men and women in four ships), after a terrible voyage of twelve weeks from the settlement of Santa Cruz (Nendö).

Doña Isabel was honoured in Manila, and Quirós was commended for his service; with both absolved of any responsibility for the results of the expedition. Isabel was accused of cruelty by the crew.

She remarried to general Fernando de Castro, again crossing the Pacific Ocean to Mexico, and then settled in Buenos Aires, where they lived for several years, before returning to Peru.

It is said that Isabel crossed the Atlantic Ocean for the last time to Spain to defend her rights over the Solomon Islands, because the King had granted the right to colonize the islands to Pedro Fernández de Quirós. She may be buried in Castrovirreyna (Peru) or in Galicia (Spain), in 1612.

=== Route ===
Route of Mendaña/Barreto/Quirós 1595 expedition:

- El Callao, April 9, 1595.
- Paita (Perú), June 16.
- Las Marquesas de Mendoza (Marquesas Islands), July 21 – August 5.
  - Magdalena (Fatu Hiva)
  - Dominica (Hiva Oa)
  - Santa Cristina (Tahuata)
  - San Pedro (Moho Tani)
- San Bernardo (Pukapuka, Cook Islands), August 20.
- La Solitaria (Niulakita, Tuvalu), August 29.
- Solomon Islands:
  - Tinakula, September 7.
  - La Huerta (Tomotu Noi), Recifes (Swallow Islands), September 8.
  - Santa Cruz (Nendö, Santa Cruz Islands), September 8 to November 18. They attempted to found a colony, where Álvaro de Mendaña died, October 18.
- Guam, January 1, 1596.
- Manila, February 11.

== In modern literature ==
The voyage's story is told in The Islands of Unwisdom, an historical novel by Robert Graves.
