= Nalögo language =

Oceanic language spoken in Solomon Islands

Santa Cruz
- Nalögo
- Native to: Solomon Islands
- Region: Santa Cruz Islands, Eastern Solomons
- Native speakers: 1,500 (2012)
- Language family: Austronesian: Malayo-Polynesian; Oceanic; Temotu ?; Reefs – Santa Cruz; Santa Cruz

Language codes
- ISO 639-3: nlz
- Glottolog: nalo1235
- Coordinates: 10°49′18″S 165°49′30″E

Nalögo (Nalögo pronunciation: [nalɵᵑgo]) is an Oceanic language spoken on the island of Nendö in the Solomon Islands. It used to be lumped together with Natügu under a single language called the "Santa Cruz language", but the two varieties were recognized to be two distinct languages in 2012.

Together, Nalögo, Natügu and Nanggu are the three indigenous languages of Nendö island.

Nalögo has been described by linguist Valentina Alfarano.

== The language ==
=== Name ===
The name Nalögo (new orth. Nalrgo) comes from nalö-go [nalɵᵑgo], literally "our language" – from nalö "language, word" + -go "1st + 2nd person augmented enclitic").

=== Genetic affiliation ===
Like its neighbours Natügu and Nanggu, Nalögo was once thought to be dialects of a language labelled “Santa Cruz”; and the latter was long thought to be a Papuan language. In the 2000s however, it became clear that was shown to be a member of the Austronesian language family, like the rest of the Reefs – Santa Cruz languages.

=== Dialects ===
Nalögo and Natügu are recognised as opposite ends of a dialect continuum. The Nalögo section of the dialect chain includes two named dialects, Nea and Nooli.

== Phonology ==
=== Consonants ===
Alfarano's analysis counts 15 consonant phonemes. They are indicated here, with the orthography in ⟨angled brackets⟩:

		Labial	Alveolar	Palatal	Velar	Labial-velar
Stop	voiceless	p ⟨p⟩	t ⟨t⟩		k ⟨k⟩	
Stop	prenas^{zd}	ᵐb ⟨b⟩	ⁿd ⟨d⟩		ᵑɡ ⟨g⟩	
Affric.	prenas^{zd}			ⁿd͡ʒ ⟨j⟩		
Nasal		m ⟨m⟩	n ⟨n⟩		ŋ ⟨ng⟩	
Fricative		v ⟨v⟩	s ⟨s⟩			
Approximant			l ⟨l⟩	j ⟨y⟩		w ⟨w⟩

Nalögo has the same consonants as those of neighbouring Natügu – with the addition of Nalögo pronunciation: [ⁿd͡ʒ].

Prenasalized stops can optionally be realized as plain voiced consonants.

=== Vowels ===
Nalögo has ten vowel phonemes:

Oral vowels
	Front	Central	Back
Close	i ⟨i⟩	ʉ ⟨ʉ⟩	u ⟨u⟩
Close-mid	e ⟨u⟩	ɵ ⟨ö⟩	o ⟨o⟩
Near-open	ɛ ⟨ä⟩	ɜ ⟨ë⟩	
Open		a ⟨a⟩	ɒ ⟨â⟩

These vowels can be nasalized; but Alfarano does not consider nasalization to be phonemic in the language.

== Bibliography ==
- Alfarano, Valentina (2021). A grammar of Nalögo, an Oceanic language of Santa Cruz Island. PhD dissertation in Linguistics (Thesis). Paris: INALCO. grammar.
