= Natügu language =

Oceanic language spoken in Solomon Islands

Santa Cruz
- Natqgu; Natügu
- Native to: Solomon Islands
- Region: Santa Cruz Islands, Eastern Solomons.
- Native speakers: 5,000 (2012)
- Language family: Austronesian: Malayo-Polynesian; Oceanic; Temotu ?; Reefs – Santa Cruz; Santa Cruz

Language codes
- ISO 639-3: Either: ntu – Natügu npx – Noipx (Noipä)
- Glottolog: natu1246
- Coordinates: 10°44′06″S 165°49′43″E

A Natügu speaker, recorded in the Solomon Islands.

Natügu (locally spelled Natqgu), formerly known as Santa Cruz, is the main language spoken on the island of Nendö or 'Santa Cruz', in the Solomon Islands. It is one of the three languages of that island, together with Nalögo and Nanggu.

== Description ==
=== Name ===
The name Natügu (new orth. Natqgu) comes from natü-gu [natʉᵑgu], literally "our language" – from natü "language, word" + -gu "1st + 2nd person augmented enclitic").

=== Genetic affiliation ===
Until the beginning of the 21st century, it was widely believed that Natügu was a Papuan language. In the 2000s however, it was shown to be a member of the Oceanic language family (in turn part of the Austronesian language family), like the rest of the Reefs – Santa Cruz languages.

=== Dialects ===
Dialects of Natügu are Bënwë (Banua), Londai, Malo. Speakers of most dialects understand Lwowa and Mbanua well.

Nalögo, once considered a dialect of Natügu, is now recognised as a separate language.

== Phonology ==
=== Consonants ===
Natügu has 14 consonant phonemes. They are indicated here, with the orthography in ⟨angled brackets⟩:

		Labial	Alveolar	Palatal	Velar	Labial-velar
Stop	voiceless	p ⟨p⟩	t ⟨t⟩		k ⟨k⟩	
Stop	prenasalised	ᵐb ⟨b⟩	ⁿd ⟨d⟩		ᵑɡ ⟨g⟩	
Nasal		m ⟨m⟩	n ⟨n⟩		ŋ ⟨ng⟩	
Fricative		v ⟨v⟩	s ⟨s⟩			
Approximant			l ⟨l⟩	j ⟨y⟩		w ⟨w⟩

Prenasalized stops can optionally be realized as plain voiced consonants.

=== Vowels ===
Oral vowels
	Front	Central	Back
Close	i	ʉ	u
Close-mid	e	ɵ	o
Near-open	æ	ə	ɔ
Open		a	

Nasal vowels
	Front	Central	Back
Close			ũ
Close-mid	ẽ	ɵ̃	õ
Near-open	æ̃	ə̃	ɔ̃
Open		ã	

== Orthography ==
The Natügu language has two orthographies. The old orthography uses diacritics to mark vowel quality and nasalization while the new orthography uses no diacritics. The new orthography was developed in 1994, motivated by concerns about the difficulty of reading and typesetting the old orthography.

Consonants
Grapheme	Phoneme
b	/b/
d	/d/
g	/ɡ/
h (Note: The letter h is used only in English loanwords.)	—
j (Note: The letter j is used natively in one dialect, and otherwise only used in English loanwords.)	/dʒ/
k	/k/
l	/l/
m	/m/
n	/n/
p	/p/
s	/s/
t	/t/
v	/β/
w	/w/
y	/j/

Vowels
Grapheme (old)	Grapheme (new)	Phoneme
a	a	/a/
e	e	/e/
i	i	/i/
o	o	/o/
u	u	/u/
â (Note: The letter â was written o̲ in earlier versions of the old orthography.)	c	/ɔ/
ü	q	/ʉ/
ö	r (Note: The letter r is also used as a consonant in English loanwords.)	/ɵ/
ä	x	/æ/
ë	z	/ə/
◌̃	◌'	/◌̃/

In the old orthography, nasal vowels are represented with a tilde over the vowel letter. In the new orthography, nasal vowels are represented with a straight apostrophe after the vowel letter.

== Grammar ==
Most of the information below comes from Boerger (2022), but is adapted to the older orthography to aid reader intuition.

=== Syntax ===
Natügu has a transitivity-based clause system that distinguishes between intransitive, transitive and semitransitive clauses. Intransitive clauses contain a single core argument, the subject (S). When the subject is a noun phrase the word order is SV, but this changes to VS when the subject is a pronominal enclitic. Transitive clauses feature two core arguments, the agent (A) and object (O), with an unmarked word order of VAO. In these clauses the agent can be a nominal argument or an enclitic, and either the agent or the object may be fronted for discourse purposes. Semitransitive clauses are morphologically intransitive but syntactically transitive, placing focus on the action whilst using generic objects. Subordinate clauses and most peripheral arguments occur post-verbally.

The language uses verbless clauses to express identity, possession and existence. Non-verbal lexemes serve as predicates in these constructions, whilst location is expressed with one of two placeholder verbs meaning 'stay' or 'live', chosen according to whether the subject is animate or inanimate.

Questions may be polar, content or tag questions. Polar questions share the same morphological structure as declarative clauses but are distinguished by a rising intonation contour, whereas content questions place question words such as neke 'who' or nike 'what' at the beginning of the clause. Standard negation is expressed by a circumfix bracketing the verb complex, with the prefix tö- at the left edge and the suffix -u at the right edge. A further circumfix pairs tö- with the aspect enclitic =ka 'not yet'; in this construction the postverbal -u is absent.

Complex syntax includes complement clauses, relative clauses, adverbial clauses and coordinate clauses. Complement clauses may be finite, introduced by the subordinator kä, or non-finite, expressed through nominalisation. Relative clauses are introduced by kä or, when the modified noun has already been established in the discourse, by the demonstrative kâ; they follow the noun phrase they modify. Adverbial clauses include temporal, reason, purpose, conditional, precautionary and concessive types. Coordination is achieved with conjunctions such as ä 'and', ã 'but' and the disjunctive particles e or o 'or', or through simple juxtaposition of clauses.

=== Verbs ===
Natügu verbs are categorised into four main classes based on their interaction with valency-changing morphology, the semantic distinction between stative and dynamic verbs, and the semantic role of intransitive subjects. The classes are intransitive, transitive, inherently semitransitive and ambitransitive. Intransitive verbs are subdivided into those that take no transitive form, those that can be causativised with the prefix a- and those that take the transitiviser -ti. Transitive verbs include a class that permits no transitivity modification and a class that takes the middle prefix ö- to form semitransitive or depatientive constructions. Inherently semitransitive verbs require the transitiviser -ti for the object to be specific rather than generic, whilst ambitransitive verbs (such as lvä 'open') can take either transitive or intransitive subjects without additional derivation.

The verb complex consists of a central verb core surrounded by up to four pre-core and 21 post-core modifier slots. The core itself may be a simple root or a complex stem formed through compounding. The pre-core slots contain an aspect proclitic, a negation prefix, a mood prefix and either the causative prefix a- or the middle prefix ö-. The post-core slots accommodate manner, degree, qualifier, quantifier and temporal adverbs; geometric directionals encoding 'up', 'down', 'in' and 'out'; the personal directionals -mü 'hither' and -bë 'yon'; core applicatives; valency-changing suffixes including the transitiviser -ti, the reflexive -lëbü and the reciprocal -etö; enclitic aspect markers; the peripheral applicative -ngö; subject and object enclitics; and the second part of the negative circumfix.

Natügu has a productive system of valency-changing morphology with 16 attested morphemes. The causative prefix a- adds a causer argument to intransitive or ambitransitive verbs. The middle prefix ö- is the primary valency-reducing device, forming semitransitive constructions with generic objects or depatientive constructions in which the object is syntactically absent. The transitiviser -ti licenses a specific object for intransitive and inherently semitransitive verbs, but also functions as a pluractional marker on transitive verbs, indicating a plurality of objects acted upon in a dispersed or scattered fashion. The reflexive -lëbü and reciprocal -etö both decrease valency when added to transitive verbs, shifting person marking to intransitive forms. Natügu also has an agentless passive, formed by the prefix në-, or the realis third-person augmented portmanteau prefix të-, appearing without an accompanying third-person augmented subject enclitic; the former object is promoted to subject position.

==== Tense–aspect–mood ====
Natügu lacks morphological tense, relying instead on free temporal adverbs, such as mëli ka 'now', bü 'yesterday', ëbü ka 'today' and bünâ 'long ago' or on contextual cues to establish temporal reference.

Aspect is encoded by proclitics in the pre-core slot of the verb complex and by enclitics in the post-core slot. The proclitic sâ= marks perfective aspect, indicating that an action has begun, whilst sa= marks imperfective aspect, indicating an ongoing or uncompleted action that may also carry a future sense. A third proclitic, the apprehensive ma= 'lest', nearly always appears in the fixed phrase muöde ma= 'because lest' followed by a realis mood prefix. The post-core aspect enclitics are =pe 'change of state', =pnë 'completive', =be 'still' and =ka 'not yet'. The change-of-state enclitic =pe is particularly versatile: with telic verbs it signals a resulting state; with atelic verbs it indicates a completed event; in combination with the imperfective proclitic it conveys imminence with punctual verbs; and in negative contexts it carries the sense of 'not anymore'.

Mood is marked in the pre-core slot by the realis prefix tü- and its third-person augmented counterpart të-, which denote events in the actual world and serve to track the primary storyline in narrative discourse. The irrealis prefix na- covers future, hypothetical, intentional, hortative, imperative and conditional contexts. The aspect proclitics and mood prefixes typically occur in semantically compatible pairings: perfective with realis (sâ= tü-) and imperfective with irrealis (sa= na-); other combinations are attested but carry specialised meanings.

=== Nouns ===
Natügu nouns lack case and number marking, with their syntactic role primarily determined by word order. The language organises nouns by four parameters:

- Count nouns vs. mass nouns: Mass nouns represent uncounted quantities and take the indefinite plural marker du 'some'. Count nouns can co-occur with numeral quantifiers. Older speakers rely on context or demonstrative modifiers to indicate plurality, though younger generations have begun attaching the plural suffix -ng(ü) to count nouns, possibly through influence from English.
- Common nouns vs. proper nouns: Proper names of people often carry gender-specific prefixes, with me- marking males and i- marking females; these prefixes are typically followed by a verb to form attributive names.
- Animate vs. inanimate nouns: This distinction governs verb selection. The verb 'stay/live' is mnâ for animate subjects and yâ for inanimate subjects; likewise 'die' is bë for animate and më for inanimate subjects. Plants are classified as inanimate.
- Direct vs. indirect possession: Directly possessed nouns, chiefly body parts and most kinship terms, take a pronominal enclitic attached directly to the noun without intervening morphology. Indirectly possessed nouns require an intervening genitive or possessive classifier between the possessed noun and its possessor.

Natügu has seven strategies for deriving complex nouns, including participant nominalisation using the subordinator kä, action nominalisation using the circumfix në-...-ngö and the toponymic prefix lö-, which derives a noun denoting people associated with a place or group. All derived and complex nouns exhibit indirect possession.

==== Possession ====
The possessive system distinguishes between direct possession, two genitive forms and eight or nine possessive classifiers. The free genitive ngö and its phonologically conditioned variant ö encode relationships of content, location and property without implying ownership. The possessive classifiers encode closer or more specific relationships, as summarised below.

Natügu possessive classifiers
Classifier	Semantic domain
sâ	Handheld and movable possessions; also used as a generic classifier
ma	Betel nut and related items (leaf, lime, container)
mü	Drinkable items including wet fruits such as papaya and watermelon
na	Edible items excluding those classified as drinkable
ne	Beings under the possessor's care or responsibility; also creative works such as songs and paintings
nyë	Immovable property and time at a fixed point (buildings, land, gardens)
mnö ~ pnö	Fire, firewood, blankets, mats and items associated with hearth and home
lö	Things closely associated with or intrinsically part of the possessor
nö	Thoughts, heart and desires; co-occurs only with words denoting mental or emotional states

A noun is not fixed to a single classifier; the choice of classifier reflects the nature of the relationship in context. For example toki 'knife' occurs with na when used for eating, mü when used for wet fruit and sâ when used for general bush work.

=== Pronouns ===
Natügu has two main sets of person and number enclitics. Set I (primary) is normally used on verbs to signal subjects and third-person objects. Set II (secondary) replaces Set I when marking subjects following the peripheral applicative and in passive clauses, and also serves as the basis for free pronouns and possessive constructions.

The pronominal system uses a minimal–augmented number distinction with four grammatical persons: first person, first-and-second person ('you and I'), second person and third person. Free subject and object pronouns are formed by attaching Set II enclitics to the base ni- 'be', whilst free indirect object pronouns are formed by attaching Set II enclitics to the dative base ba-. The third person augmented is exceptional in combining a prefix (në-, të- for realis or na- for irrealis) with an enclitic to form a circumfix.

Natügu enclitic pronouns
Person	Set I	Set II
1st minimal	=ä	=nge
1st+2nd minimal	=ki	=gi
2nd minimal	=u	=m(ü)
3rd minimal	=le	=de
1st augmented	=kö	=gö
1st+2nd augmented	=ku	=gu
2nd augmented	=amu	=mu
3rd augmented	=lö, =ng(ü)	=dö, =ng(ü)

=== Adjectives ===
Natügu has only six simple true adjectives: amölä 'all', angidö 'true', dau 'main', dölö 'wild', täne 'lowly' and ëpwä 'real'. They immediately follow the noun they modify without intervening morphemes. Other adjectival concepts such as size, colour, age and evaluative properties are expressed as stative verbs requiring the subordinator kä, yielding a construction of the form NP + kä + stative verb. The proprietive suffix -ngö may further derive stative verbs from nouns, indicating that the referent possesses a given property.

Natügu lacks dedicated comparative and superlative morphemes. Comparative degree is conveyed by appending the geometric directional 'out' (-pä) and the personal directional 'yon' (-bë) to the adjective-verb, whilst the superlative inserts the degree adverb ëlwë 'very/much' before the final directional. More explicit comparisons may employ the verb mya 'surpass' together with a geometric directional specifying the dimension of comparison.

=== Demonstratives ===
The demonstrative system is organised as a two-by-two grid. The consonants l- and k- signal listener-anchored and speaker-anchored reference respectively, whilst the vowels a and â distinguish proximal from distal reference based on spatial, temporal or discourse parameters. The four simple demonstratives are la (listener-anchored proximal), lâ (listener-anchored distal), ka (speaker-anchored proximal) and kâ (speaker-anchored distal). All four can co-occur with affixes encoding plurality, specificity and change of state. The distal kâ is particularly frequent, outnumbering the other demonstratives in connected discourse, and regularly functions as a subordinator or relativiser when the modified noun is already established in the discourse.

=== Numerals ===
Number	Natügu
1	esë̃, tesë̃ (Note: Used when counting.)
2	li
3	tü
4	pwä
5	nëlvün
6	esë̃më
7	rlimë
8	rtümë
9	rpwämë

Number	Natügu
10	nëpnu, nëpnu-esë̃
20	nëpnu-li
30	nëpnu-tü
40	nëpnu-pwä
50	nëpnu-nëlvün
60	nëpnu-esë̃më
70	nëpnu-rlimë
80	nëpnu-rtümë
90	nëpnu-rpwämë

Number	Natügu
100	trtüki, trtüki-esë̃
200	trtüki-li
300	trtüki-tü
400	trtüki-pwä
500	trtüki-nëlvün
600	trtüki-esë̃më
700	trtüki-rlimë
800	trtüki-rtümë
900	trtüki-rpwämë

The numeral system follows an imperfect decimal pattern built around two sets of five. The numbers one through five are non-derived simplex forms, whilst six through nine are compounds consisting of a base for one through four with the suffix -më, and ten is a unique non-derived form. Larger numbers are assembled using the connector nrade 'its fruit' to separate the tens from the units and nöbalü 'freely' to separate hundred-thousands from lower values. Ordinal numerals are derived by prefixing kra- to the corresponding cardinal, with the exception of the suppletive forms kai 'first in time or sequence' and ayönö 'first in importance'.

=== Adverbs ===
Adverbs are divided into five classes: manner, degree, qualifier, quantifier and temporal, which occupy specific post-core slots within the verb complex. Some temporal adverbs such as mou 'again/further' and ëvë 'always' may also occur as sentential adjuncts outside the verb complex, modifying entire clauses.

=== Prepositions ===
Natügu has a single preposition, më, likely a reflex of Proto-Oceanic *ma, which encodes a wide range of peripheral roles including instrument, location, source and accompaniment. Prepositional phrases introduced by më normally follow the predicate, though they may open a sentence when referring back to the preceding discourse.

=== Conjunctions ===
The principal coordinating conjunctions are ä 'and', the adversative ã 'but' and the disjunctive e or o 'or'. The disjunctive historically was e, but over recent generations has largely been replaced by o, a borrowing from Solomon Islands Pijin ultimately derived from English or. Clauses may also be juxtaposed without an overt conjunction, with the coordinative or adversative relationship inferred from context.

== Bibliography ==
- Boerger, Brenda H. (December 2022), A Grammar Sketch of Natqgu [ntu]: An Oceanic language of Santa Cruz, Solomon Islands, SIL International
