= Tanimbili language =

Endangered language of Solomon Islands

Tanimbili
- Tanibili
- Native to: Solomon Islands
- Region: Utupua
- Native speakers: (15 cited 1999)
- Language family: Austronesian: Malayo-Polynesian; Oceanic; Temotu; Utupua; Tanimbili

Language codes
- ISO 639-3: tbe
- Glottolog: tani1255
- ELP: Tanimbili
- Tanimbili is classified as Severely Endangered by the UNESCO Atlas of the World's Languages in Danger.

Tanimbili (Tanibili), or Nyisunggu, is a nearly-extinct language spoken on the island of Utupua, in the easternmost province of the Solomon Islands.

== Bibliography ==
- Tryon, Darrell (1994). "Language contact and contact-induced language change in the Eastern Outer Islands, Solomon Islands". In Tom Dutton; Darrell Tryon (eds.). Language Contact and Change in the Austronesian World. Berlin: Mouton de Gruyter. pp. 611–648. ISBN 978-3-11-088309-1..
