= Nendö =

Island in Solomon Islands

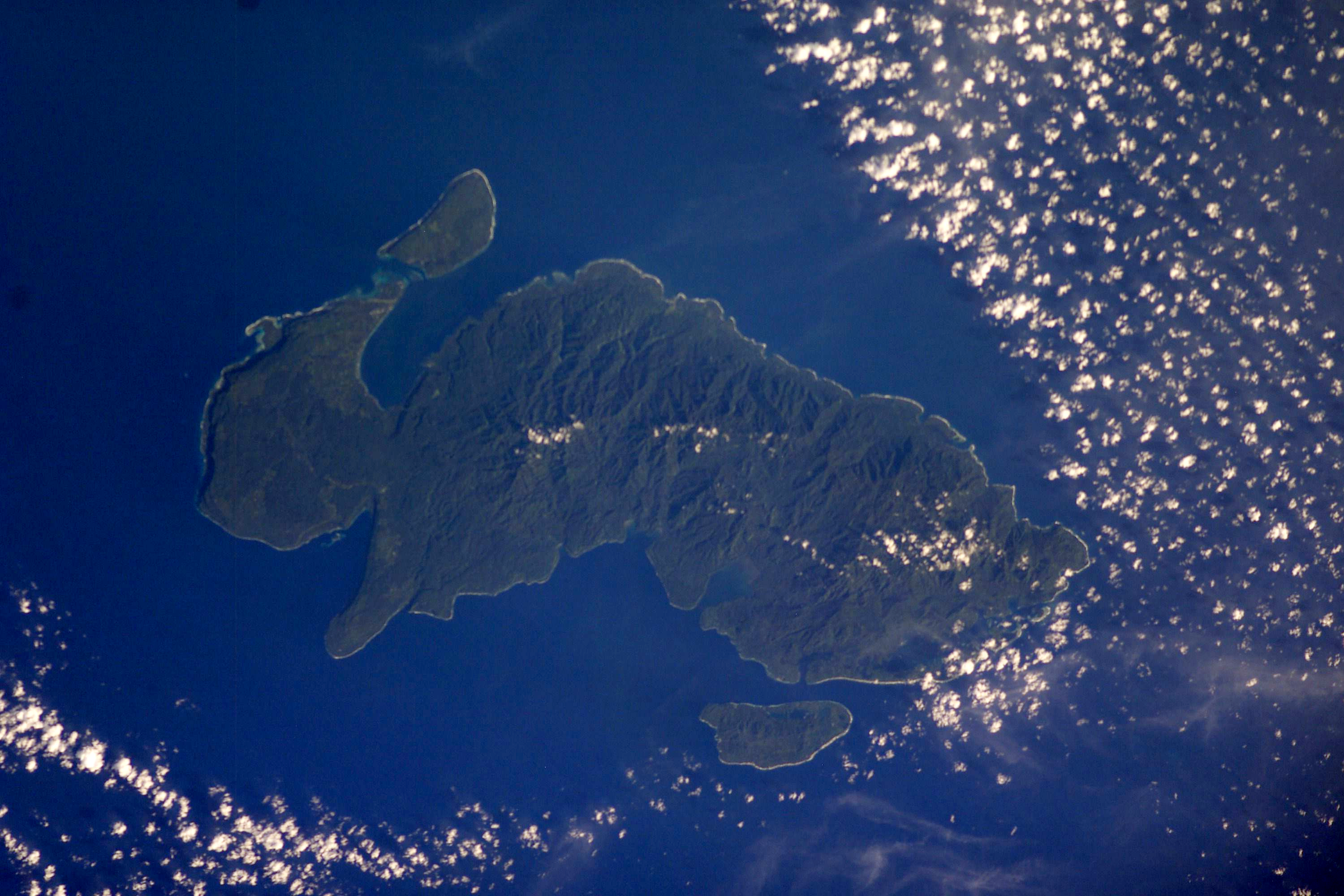
NASA picture of Nendö, the largest of the Santa Cruz Islands

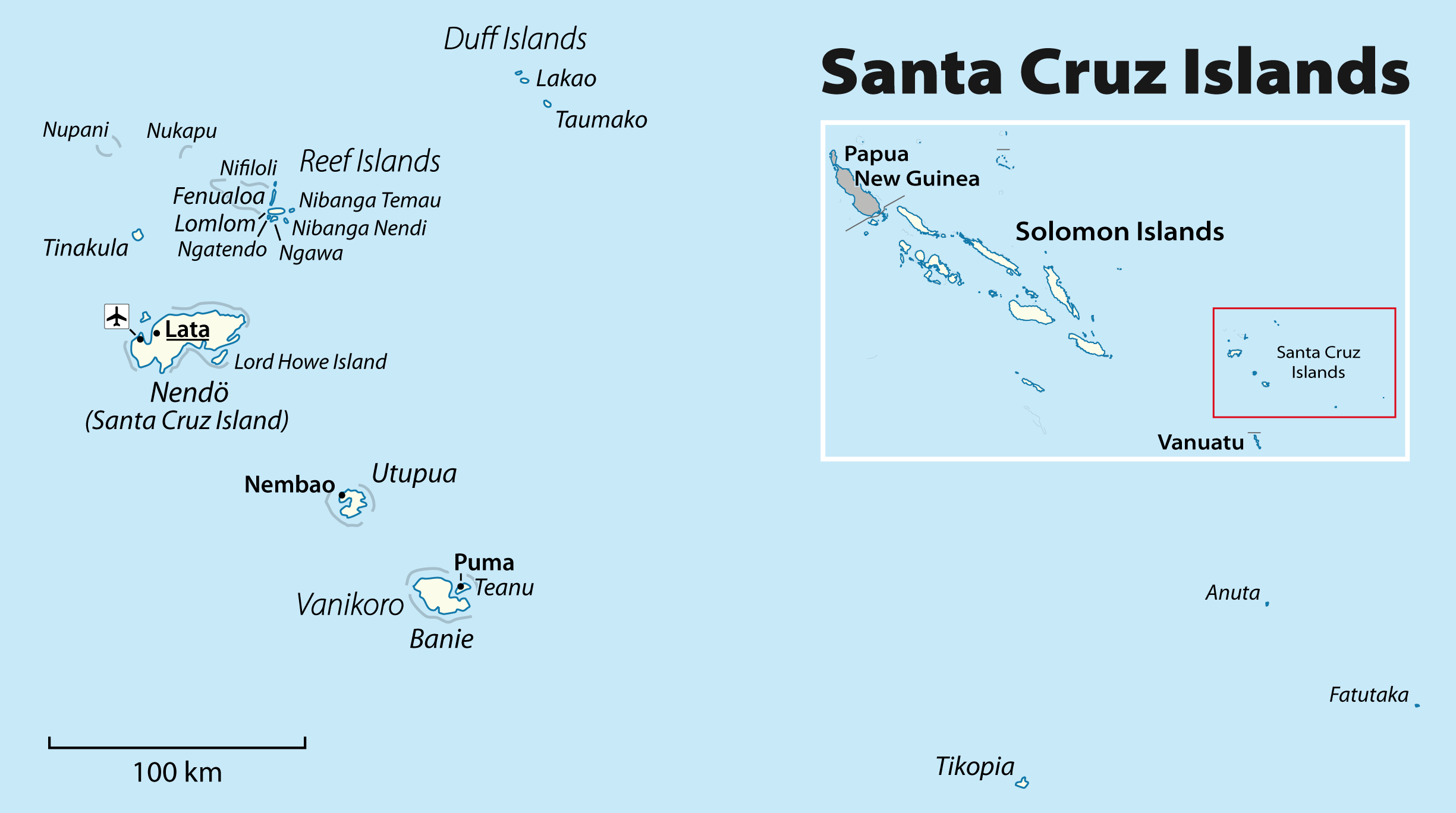

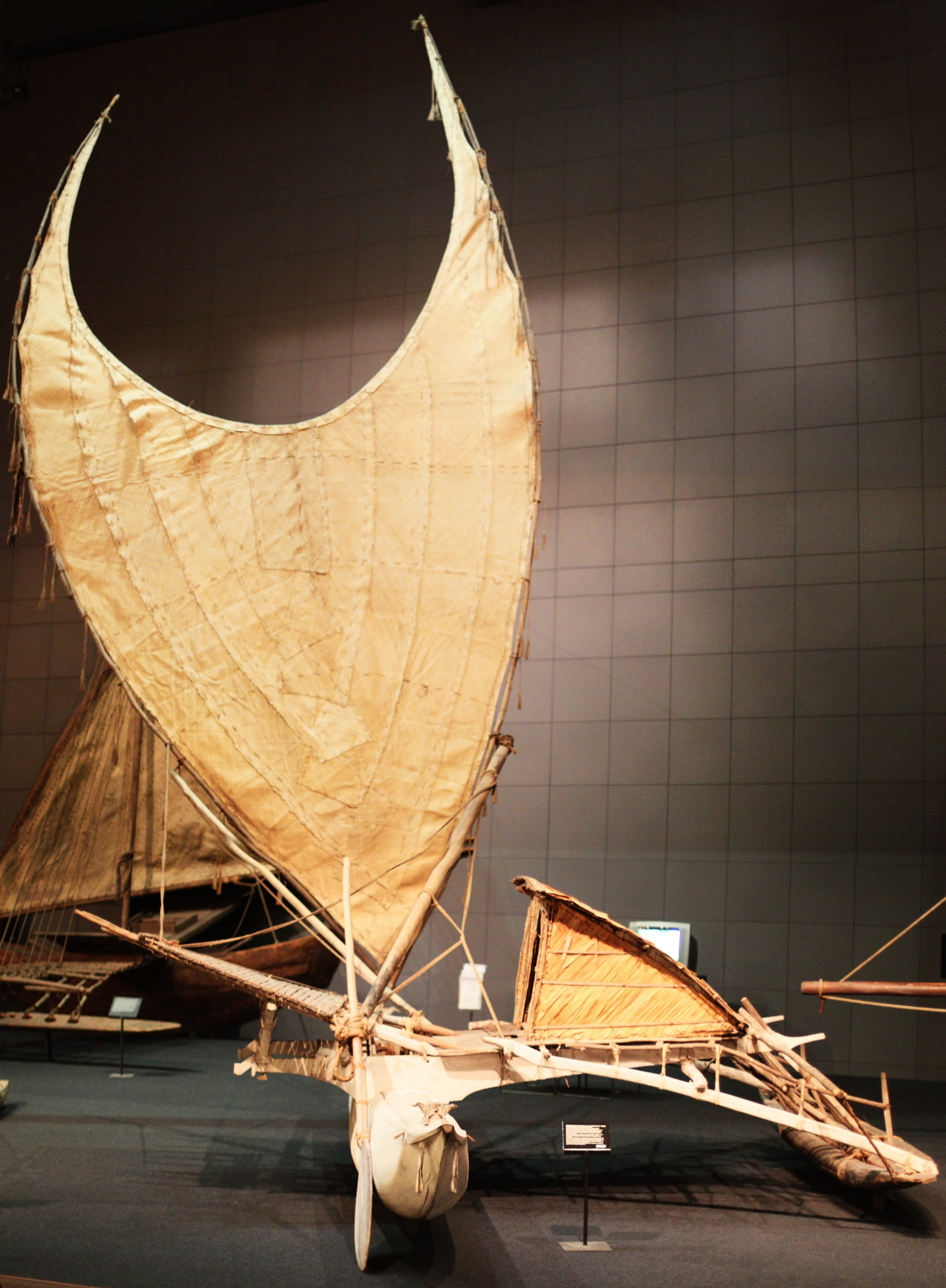
Tepukei (ocean-going outrigger canoe) from the Santa Cruz Islands

Nendö ([neⁿdɵ]) is the largest of the Santa Cruz Islands, located in the Temotu province of Solomon Islands. The island is also known as Santa Cruz, Nendo, Ndeni, Nitendi or Ndende. The name Santa Cruz was given to the island in 1595 by the Spanish navigator Álvaro de Mendaña, who started a colony there. Historically, the island has also been called New Guernsey and Lord Egmont's Island, after John Perceval, 2nd Earl of Egmont, First Lord of the Admiralty.

== Geography ==
Located at 10°25′12″S 165°30′00″E, Nendö is 40 km (25 mi.) long and 22 km (14 mi.) wide. Its land area is 505.5 km² (195 sq. mi.). The highest point on the island is 549 m (1,801 ft.) above sea level.

The two small islands of Malo and Nibanga (also called Tömotu Neo and Tömotu Noi), lie about 1 kilometre (0.5 nmi; 0.6 mi) distant: Malo to the northwest, Nibanga to the southeast.

Lata, located in the northwestern part of the island, is its chief town and the provincial capital.

Luova Airport, at Graciosa Bay, serves Nendö.

=== Environment ===
Nendö, along with neighbouring Malo, has been identified by BirdLife International as an Important Bird Area (IBA) because it supports a population of the endemic Santa Cruz shrikebills, also known as the Nendo shrikebill. Potential threats to the site come from logging and cyclones.

=== Earthquakes ===
Due to the island's location along the Ring of Fire, earthquakes are frequent; some of them are large.

== History and demography ==
Attempting to return to the Solomon Islands archipelago, which he had encountered in 1568, Spanish explorer Álvaro de Mendaña in his second trip of 1595, discovered Nendö Island on 8 September 1595, which they named Santa Cruz. Mendaña landed at what they named Graciosa Bay (still its name today), and a settlement was commenced. Relations with local islanders and their chief Malope started well, with food provided and assistance in constructing buildings. However, morale amongst the Spanish was low and sickness (almost certainly malaria) was rife. At that point some soldiers deliberately murdered villagers in order to provoke hostilities and so force the abandonment of the colony, and seditious petitions were signed. Mendaña took action, and at his behest Maestre de Campo Pedro Merino Manrique, leader of the malcontents, was cut down in his presence, and on the same day the Spaniards' best friend, Malope, was murdered by some of Manrique's gang.

Wracked by internal divisions and an increasing death toll, the settlement began to fall apart. Mendaña himself died on 18 October 1595, leaving his wife Isabel Barreto as heir and governor, her brother Lorenzo Barreto as captain-general. On 30 October, the decision was made to abandon the settlement. When the three ships departed on 18 November 1595, forty-seven people had died in the space of one month, and the first European colony in the South Seas was ended.

In August 1767, Philip Carteret in HMS Swallow encountered the island, which he named "Lord Egmont's island" or "Egmont island", recognising it as the Santa Cruz of the Spanish. Carteret sent the ship's Master with fifteen men in the cutter to explore, whilst another ten men in the longboat collected water. After an initially friendly encounter, the Master gave the inhabitants "just cause of offence" leading to a violent exchange of arrows and muskets, and the deaths of several British and many natives. Two days later, after minor repairs, Carteret sent men to collect more water, and the ensuing confrontation led to him firing the ship's guns on the inhabitants, who had attacked the voyagers in retaliation or in an attempt to drive them away. Sailing westward along the north coast of the island, he observed several villages; reaching "Trevanion's lagoon" they found "both the main and the island appeared to be one continued town, and the inhabitants were innumerable". Hogs, poultry, coconuts, bananas, and other vegetables were reported among the local produce. Due to hostilities, Carteret was unable to trade for much-needed food, and with widespread illness among his crew, had not the strength to take supplies by force from the organised and well-armed defenders.

=== Population and languages ===
Nendö's population is somewhat over 6,000. Among indigenous people of Nendö, about 5,000 speak Natügu; 1,500 speak Nalögo; and there are about 200 speakers of Nanggu. All three languages belong to the Reefs – Santa Cruz family.

Also living on the island are speakers of other Temotu province languages: e.g. Äiwoo (also a Reefs – Santa Cruz language), and Vaeakau-Taumako, a Polynesian outlier.

=== Culture ===
In 1966–67 Gerd Koch, a German anthropologist, carried out field studies on the culture of Nendö and other Santa Cruz Islands. In 1971 Koch published Die Materielle Kultur der Santa Cruz-Inseln. Koch brought back to the Ethnological Museum of Berlin the last still complete Tepukei (ocean-going outrigger canoe) from the Santa Cruz Islands.
