= Álvaro de Mendaña de Neira =

Spanish navigator and explorer (1542–1595)

Álvaro de Mendaña y Neira
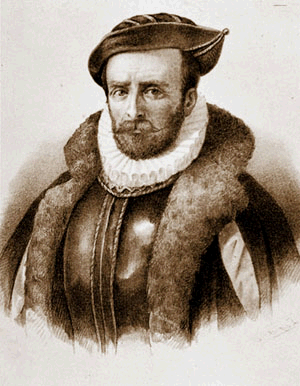
- Imaginary portrait by a 19th-century artist
- Born: 1 October 1542; Congosto, Spain
- Died: 18 October 1595 (aged 53); Santa Cruz, Spanish East Indies
- Occupations: Explorer, navigator, cartographer
- Spouse: Isabel Barreto

Álvaro de Mendaña y Neira (or Neyra) (Spanish pronunciation: [ˈalβaɾo ðe menˈdaɲa i ˈnejɾa]; 1 October 1542 – 18 October 1595) was a Spanish navigator, explorer, and cartographer, best known for two of the earliest recorded expeditions across the Pacific Ocean in 1567 and 1595. His voyages led to the discovery of the Marquesas, Cook Islands, and Solomons among other archipelagos. Born in Congosto, in El Bierzo Region (León), he was the nephew of Lope García de Castro, viceroy of Peru.

== Search for Terra Australis ==
Between 1565 and 1605, three important Spanish voyages of exploration left Peru bound for the southwest Pacific. One inspiration for these voyages was Spanish soldier Pedro Sarmiento de Gamboa who arrived in Peru in 1557. Sarmiento de Gamboa developed an interest in Inca stories of gold and riches being collected from lands further to the west. Sarmiento's proposal for an expedition to find land in the Pacific was put to Governor Lope García de Castro, finding favour as it matched common Spanish belief in the existence of a great South Land. Historian Miriam Estensen argues that Governor Castro also agreed as a way of maintaining peace and order. "Restless and disruptive" elements in the Spanish Americas were encouraged to join such journeys of exploration to remove them from colonial society. The lure of possible wealth made these expeditions attractive to such men, often drawn from the poorest levels of society.

However, Sarmiento de Gamboa was bitterly disappointed not to be made Captain-General of the expedition. Instead, command was given to the Governor Castro's nephew, the younger and relatively inexperienced Álvaro de Mendaña de Neira. Sarmiento was to be "Cosmographer". In Sarmiento's written account, he was Captain of the flagship and at least on the same level as chief pilot and navigator Hernando Gallego. While Sarmiento's interest was the riches to be gained, Mendaña's priority was conversion of "the heathen" to Christianity. Deep divisions had been created within the Spanish command, even before the expedition departed.

=== Voyage of 1567–1569 ===
The two ships, the 200-ton Los Reyes (the Capitana or flagship) and the 140-ton Todos Santos (the Almiranta or secondary ship) sailed from Callao, in Peru on 20 November 1567, with about 150 sailors, soldiers, priests and slaves on board.

After sighting a small island in mid January (probably Nui in what is now Tuvalu), a significant body of land was sighted on 7 February 1568. It was Santa Isabel Island, where they landed several days later. The expedition had discovered the Solomon Islands which were named Islas Salomon on the expedition's return. The Spanish immediately came into contact with Solomon Islanders who were later found to be cannibals, though at first the relationship was cordial. However, the Spanish expedition's need for fresh food and water quickly led to tension and conflict as the islanders were unable to provide supplies after some time. The real prizes were pigs, desperately needed by the Spanish, which were also important to the local people's economy. The Spanish were horrified to find the islanders were cannibals when they were offered "a quarter of a boy with the arm and hand" which the islanders urged Mendaña to eat.

After building a small brigantine, the surrounding islands of Malaita, Guadalcanal, Makira (which was named San Cristobal) and Choiseul Island were explored. However, the attempts to barter for food led to the same cycle of friendly welcome, misunderstandings, sullen retreats, occasional reconciliations, robberies and violent retaliation. Finally, at a council meeting of captains, pilots, soldiers and sailors on 7 August 1568, the decision was made to return to Peru. Mendaña had wanted to sail further south, while Sarmiento de Gamboa and several soldiers unsuccessfully urged the establishment of a colony.

The two ships sailed north then east, passing the Marshall Islands and Wake Island, before reaching the Mexican coast in late January 1569. It was a long and difficult voyage, with numerous deaths from scurvy.

==== Results of the first voyage ====
The main result of the expedition was the discovery for Europeans of the Solomon Islands and Tuvalu. The navigators also gained valuable sailing experience for Spain, especially in crossing the vast South Pacific from Peru. These discoveries led to successive expeditions in search for Terra Australis, both by Mendaña himself and by Pedro Fernandes de Queirós. However, the Great South Land had not yet been discovered by Europeans. The islands found, by now popularly called the Solomon Islands, had not revealed more than a few indications of gold. There were no spices and the people had not been converted to Christianity, although one family of Solomon Islanders abducted by the Spanish did become devout Christians in Peru.

The Island of St Francis (Spanish: Isla de San Francisco; French: Île Saint-François) seen on the return voyage was probably Wake but it was in attempting to relocate it that James Cook first reached the Hawaiian Islands.

=== Voyage of 1595–1596 ===
A much larger and costlier expedition had been planned by the early 1590s, after Mendaña had spent years courting favour in Madrid and Lima. Four ships and 378 men, women and children were to establish a colony in the Solomon Islands. Again, the leaders of this voyage had "widely divergent personalities". Mendaña was again in command, accompanied by his wife Isabel Barreto, her three brothers and a sister. Chief pilot was to be a young Portuguese navigator in Spanish service, Pedro Fernandes de Queirós. An argumentative old soldier, Pedro Merino Manrique was chosen as camp master. Manrique caused disputes before the fleet had even departed.

The four ships, San Gerónimo (the Capitana), the Santa Ysabel (the Almiranta), the smaller frigate Santa Catalina and the galiot San Felipe left Callao on 9 April 1595. Spirits were high in the first month, fifteen marriages being celebrated. Mendaña had Queirós prepare charts for his Captains that only showed Peru and the Solomon Islands.

On 21 July 1595, the ships reached the Marquesas Islands (named for the wife of the then-viceroy of Peru, García Hurtado de Mendoza, 5th Marquis of Cañete) to be met by four hundred people in canoes. Although the Spaniards admired their "graceful shape" and "almost white" complexion, the relationship with the natives later deteriorated. When the expedition left two weeks later, Queirós estimated 200 Marquesans had been killed.

Spanish activity in the Solomon and Santa Cruz Islands.

Despite Mendaña's confidence that the Solomon Islands were nearby, it was not until 8 September that they sighted land again, this time the island of Nendo, which they named "Santa Cruz". The Santa Ysabel had disappeared, however, and despite searches by the two smaller vessels, it could not be found. Arriving at what is now Graciosa Bay, a settlement was commenced. Relations with local islanders and their chief Malope started well, with food provided and assistance in constructing buildings. However, morale amongst the Spanish was low and sickness (speculated to be either malaria or scrub typhus) was rife. Manrique was murdered at the orders of, and in front of Mendaña, and shortly afterwards, Malope was killed by soldiers. Relations with the Islanders soon worsened.

Wracked by internal divisions and an increasing death toll, the settlement began to fall apart. Mendaña himself died on 18 October 1595, leaving his wife as heir and governor, her brother Lorenzo as captain-general. On 30 October, the decision was made to abandon the settlement. When the three ships departed on 18 November 1595, forty-seven people had died in the space of one month.

Pedro Fernandes de Queirós is credited with bringing the San Gerónimo safely into the Philippines without the aid of charts, arriving in Manila Bay on 11 February 1596. Over fifty people died on the twelve-week voyage from Santa Cruz, in part due to the lack of food supplies and allegedly Isabel Barreto's refusal to share out her private store of food and water. The frigate (carrying Mendaña's body) disappeared during the voyage, while the galiot San Felipe arrived in the southern end of Mindanao several days later.

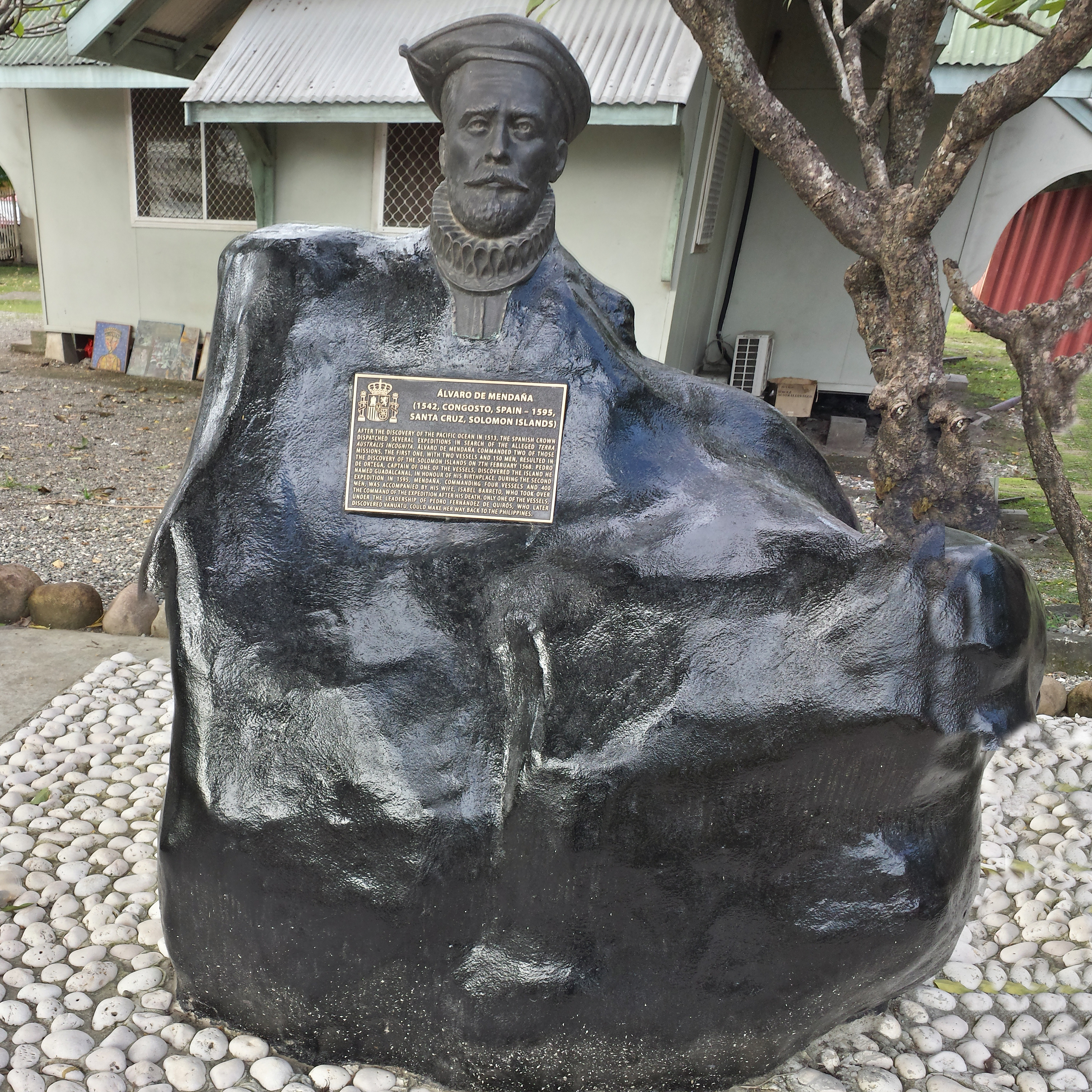
Bust at Solomon Island museum at Point Cruz

=== Aftermath ===
Of the 378 who sailed from Peru, about 100 survived, but ten more died shortly after arriving in Manila. Isabel Barreto was honoured in Manila and Queirós was commended for his service and absolved of any responsibility for the killings on Santa Cruz. Three months later Doña Isabel married the governor's cousin. She continued to agitate for a return to the Solomon Islands. She died in 1612.

Back in Peru in June 1597, Queirós began his campaign to return to the Solomon Islands, leading the next Spanish venture in 1605. This expedition was also unsuccessful, but it led to the discovery of the Pitcairn Islands and Vanuatu which were explored, and briefly settled in the case of Espiritu Santo. Queirós visited the Solomons in 1606, but was unable to establish a settlement. The Solomons were not again visited by outsiders until 1767, when Philip Carteret sighted Santa Cruz and Malaita islands.

The story of the voyage is told in The Islands of Unwisdom, a historical novel by Robert Graves.

== See also ==
- Pedro Fernandes de Queirós
