= Reefs–Santa Cruz languages =

Group of Oceanic languages in the Solomon Islands

Reef Islands–Santa Cruz
- Reefs–Santa Cruz
- Geographic distribution: Solomon Islands
- Linguistic classification: Austronesian: Malayo-Polynesian; Oceanic; Temotu; Reef Islands–Santa Cruz
- Proto-language: Proto-Reefs – Santa Cruz (Proto-RSC)
- Subdivisions: Äiwoo; Nendi (Santa Cruz)

Language codes
- Glottolog: reef1242

The Reef Islands–Santa Cruz languages (usually shortened to Reefs–Santa Cruz, abbreviated RSC) are a branch of the Oceanic languages comprising the languages of the Santa Cruz Islands and Reef Islands:

- Äiwoo (also known as Reefs)
- languages of the island of Nendö (Santa Cruz):
  - Nanggu (also known as Engdewu)
  - Natügu
  - Nalögo
  - Noipä (Noipx)

== Background ==
The debate in Oceanic linguistics dated from the Second International Conference on Austronesian Linguistics in 1978, where two opposing papers were presented. Peter Lincoln argued that the Reefs – Santa Cruz languages were Oceanic, while Stephen Wurm argued that they were Papuan languages.

== Classification ==
These languages were only definitively classified as part of the Oceanic subgroup of the Austronesian family after a series of papers that refuted the three major arguments for classifying them as either primarily Papuan languages or at least heavily influenced by a Papuan substrate.

- Malcolm Ross and Åshild Næss (2007) demonstrated regular sound correspondences between the reconstructed ancestor Proto-Oceanic and RSC languages. Among other changes, RSC languages are characterized by a pervasive syncope of vowels and truncation of syllables.
- Åshild Næss (2006) showed that the "multiple noun classes" in RSC do not resemble Papuan-style gender systems, but do have parallels in other Oceanic languages of nearby Vanuatu.
- Åshild Næss and Brenda H. Boerger (2008) showed that the complex verbal structures of RSC are derived by normal erosion of verb morphology and grammaticalization of verb serialization commonly found in many Oceanic languages, and thus do not reflect a Papuan substrate.
- William James Lackey and Brenda H. Boerger (2021) revises the reconstruction made by Ross and Næss (2008), and outlines in detail some regular correspondences between RSC and Proto-Oceanic consonants that were overlooked, such as *s > t (and later t > s before /i/). They also conclude that the truncation of syllables in Proto-RSC was primarily driven by stress: words that contained a Proto-Oceanic final consonant, being oxytone, preserved their final syllable; likewise, syncope (word-medially) took place if the word originally ended in a final consonant, or was trisyllabic.

Ross and Næss (2007) offer a retrospective conclusion:

How then did it come about that Stephen Wurm thought the RSC [Reefs – Santa Cruz] languages were Papuan? In small measure because the reconstruction of POc had in the 1970s not progressed to where it is today. In larger measure because the typological features he found in the RSC languages had yet to be documented in other Oceanic languages. And because the RSC languages had undergone phonological changes which rendered some cognates unrecognizable and led eventually to the replacement of others.
