= The Islands of Unwisdom =

1949 novel by Robert Graves

- First edition cover (US)
- Author: Robert Graves
- Language: English
- Genre: Historical novel
- Publisher: Doubleday (US), 1949; Cassell (UK), 1950
- Publication place: United Kingdom
- Media type: print

The Islands of Unwisdom is an historical novel by Robert Graves, published in 1949. It was also published in the UK as The Isles of Unwisdom.

== Plot ==
It is a reconstruction of an historic event, the voyage of Álvaro de Mendaña de Neira to find the Solomon Islands. Graves tells a story with many surprising twists, in which some characters turn out to be quite different from how they are first portrayed. In Graves's telling, when the Spanish first come into contact with Solomon Islanders, the relationship is cordial. However, the Spanish expedition's need for fresh food and water quickly leads to tension and conflict, the Solomon Islanders’ subsistence economy being unable to provide continuous supplies. The real prizes are pigs, desperately needed by the Spanish, while vital to the local people's economy. The tensions cannot be resolved, and so the Spaniards sail home. Graves also considered that the story summarizes the reasons Spain lost its early lead in exploring the world.

== Millennium Graves ==
The novel was republished in 2003 as part of the 'Millennium Graves' edition.
