= List of airports by IATA code: T =

IATA	ICAO	Airport name	Location served
-TA-
TAA		Tarapaina Airport	Tarapaina, Solomon Islands
TAB	TTCP	Arthur Napoleon Raymond Robinson International Airport	Tobago, Trinidad and Tobago
TAC	RPVA	Daniel Z. Romualdez Airport	Tacloban, Philippines
TAD	KTAD	Perry Stokes Airport	Trinidad, Colorado, United States
TAE	RKTN	Daegu International Airport	Daegu, South Korea
TAF	DAOL	Oran Tafaraoui Airport	Oran, Algeria
TAG	RPSP	Bohol–Panglao International Airport	Tagbilaran, Philippines
TAH	NVVW	Whitegrass Airport	Tanna Island, Vanuatu
TAI	OYTZ	Taiz International Airport	Taiz (Ta'izz), Yemen
TAJ		Tadji Airport	Aitape, Papua New Guinea
TAK	RJOT	Takamatsu Airport	Takamatsu, Shikoku, Japan
TAL	PATA	Ralph M. Calhoun Memorial Airport	Tanana, Alaska, United States
TAM	MMTM	General Francisco Javier Mina International Airport	Tampico, Tamaulipas, Mexico
TAN	YTGA	Tangalooma Airport	Tangalooma, Queensland, Australia
TAO	ZSQD	Qingdao Jiaodong International Airport	Qingdao, Shandong, China
TAP	MMTP	Tapachula International Airport	Tapachula, Chiapas, Mexico
TAQ		Tarcoola Airport	Tarcoola, South Australia, Australia
TAR	LIBG	Taranto-Grottaglie Airport	Taranto, Apulia, Italy
TAS	UTTT	Tashkent International Airport	Tashkent, Uzbekistan
TAT	LZTT	Poprad–Tatry Airport	Poprad, Slovakia
TAU		Tauramena Airport	Tauramena, Colombia
TAV		Tau Airport (FAA: HI36)	Tau, American Samoa
TAW	SUTB	Tacuarembó Airport	Tacuarembó, Uruguay
TAX	WAPT	Taliabu Airport	Taliabu, Indonesia
TAY	EETU	Tartu Airport	Tartu, Estonia
TAZ	UTAT	Daşoguz Airport	Daşoguz (Dashoguz), Turkmenistan
-TB-
TBA		Tabibuga Airport	Tabibuga, Papua New Guinea
TBB	VVTH	Dong Tac Airport	Tuy Hòa, Vietnam
TBC		Tuba City Airport (FAA: T03)	Tuba City, Arizona, United States
TBD	SKMB	Timbiquí Airport	Timbiquí, Colombia
TBE		Timbunke Airport	Timbunke, Papua New Guinea
TBF	NGTE	Tabiteuea North Airport	Tabiteuea North, Kiribati
TBG	AYTB	Tabubil Airport	Tabubil, Papua New Guinea
TBH	RPVU	Tugdan Airport	Tablas Island, Philippines
TBI	MYCB	New Bight Airport	New Bight, Cat Island, Bahamas
TBJ	DTKA	Tabarka–Aïn Draham International Airport	Tabarka, Tunisia
TBK	YTBR	Timber Creek Airport	Timber Creek, Northern Territory, Australia
TBL	YTAB	Tableland Homestead Airport	Tableland, Western Australia, Australia
TBM	WAOW	Tumbang Samba Airport	Tumbang Samba, Indonesia
TBN	KTBN	Waynesville-St. Robert Regional Airport (Forney Field)	Fort Leonard Wood, Missouri, United States
TBO	HTTB	Tabora Airport	Tabora, Tanzania
TBP	SPME	Cap. FAP Pedro Canga Rodríguez Airport	Tumbes, Peru
TBQ		Tarabo Airport	Tarabo, Papua New Guinea
TBR	KTBR	Statesboro–Bulloch County Airport	Statesboro, Georgia, United States
TBS	UGTB	Tbilisi International Airport	Tbilisi, Georgia
TBT	SBTT	Tabatinga International Airport	Tabatinga, Amazonas, Brazil
TBU	NFTF	Fuaʻamotu International Airport	Nukuʻalofa, Tonga
TBV		Tabal Airport	Tabal Island, Aur Atoll, Marshall Islands
TBW	UUOT	Tambov Donskoye Airport	Tambov, Tambov Oblast, Russia
TBY	FBTS	Tshabong Airport	Tsabong, Botswana
TBZ	OITT	Tabriz International Airport	Tabriz, Iran
-TC-
TCA	YTNK	Tennant Creek Airport	Tennant Creek, Northern Territory, Australia
TCB	MYAT	Treasure Cay Airport	Treasure Cay, Abaco Islands, Bahamas
TCC	KTCC	Tucumcari Municipal Airport	Tucumcari, New Mexico, United States
TCD	SKRA	Tarapacá Airport	Tarapacá, Colombia
TCE	LRTC	Tulcea Danube Delta Airport	Tulcea, Romania
TCF		Tocoa Airport	Tocoa, Honduras
TCG	ZWTC	Tacheng Airport	Tacheng, Xinjiang, China
TCH	FOOT	Tchibanga Airport	Tchibanga, Gabon
TCI		metropolitan area^{1}	Tenerife, Canary Islands, Spain
TCJ		Torembi Airport	Torembi, Papua New Guinea
TCK		Tinboli Airport	Tinboli, Papua New Guinea
TCL	KTCL	Tuscaloosa Regional Airport	Tuscaloosa, Alabama, United States
TCM	KTCM	McChord Field	Tacoma, Washington, United States
TCN	MMHC	Tehuacán Airport	Tehuacán, Puebla, Mexico
TCO	SKCO	La Florida Airport	Tumaco, Colombia
TCP	HETB	Taba International Airport	Taba, Egypt
TCQ	SPTN	Coronel FAP Carlos Ciriani Santa Rosa International Airport	Tacna, Peru
TCR	VOTK	Tuticorin Airport	Thoothukudi (Tuticorin), Tamil Nadu, India
TCS	KTCS	Truth or Consequences Municipal Airport	Truth or Consequences, New Mexico, United States
TCT		Takotna Airport	Takotna, Alaska, United States
TCU	FATN	Thaba Nchu Airport	Thaba 'Nchu, South Africa
TCV	MYTC	Torch Cay Airport	Torch Cay, Bahamas
TCW	YTOC	Tocumwal Airport	Tocumwal, New South Wales, Australia
TCX	OIMT	Tabas Airport	Tabas, Iran
TCY	FYTE	Terrace Bay Airport	Terrace Bay, Namibia
TCZ	ZUTC	Tengchong Tuofeng Airport	Tengchong, Yunnan, China
-TD-
TDA	SKTD	Trinidad Airport	Trinidad, Colombia
TDB		Tetebedi Airport	Tetebedi, Papua New Guinea
TDD	SLTR	Teniente Jorge Henrich Arauz Airport	Trinidad, Bolivia
TDG	RPMW	Tandag Airport	Tandag, Philippines
TDJ	HDTJ	Tadjoura Airport	Tadjoura, Djibouti
TDK		Taldykorgan Airport	Taldykorgan, Kazakhstan
TDL	SAZT	Tandil Airport	Tandil, Buenos Aires, Argentina
TDN	YTHD	Theda Station Airport	Theda Station, Western Australia, Australia
TDO	KTDO	South Lewis County Airport (Ed Carlson Memorial Field)	Toledo, Washington, United States
TDP	SPDR	Trompeteros Airport	Trompeteros, Peru
TDR	YTDR	Theodore Airport	Theodore, Queensland, Australia
TDS	AYSS	Sasereme Airport	Sasereme, Papua New Guinea
TDT		Tanda Tula Airport	Timbavati, South Africa
TDV	FMSN	Samangoky Airport	Tanandava, Madagascar
TDW	KTDW	Tradewind Airport	Amarillo, Texas, United States
TDX	VTBO	Trat Airport	Trat, Thailand
TDZ	KTDZ	Toledo Executive Airport	Toledo, Ohio, United States
-TE-
TEA	MHTE	Tela Airport	Tela, Honduras
TEB	KTEB	Teterboro Airport	Teterboro, New Jersey, United States
TEC	SBTL	Telêmaco Borba Airport	Telêmaco Borba, Paraná, Brazil
TED	EKTS	Thisted Airport	Thisted, Denmark
TEE	DABS	Cheikh Larbi Tébessi Airport	Tébessa, Algeria
TEF	YTEF	Telfer Airport	Telfer, Western Australia, Australia
TEG	DFET	Tenkodogo Airport	Tenkodogo, Burkina Faso
TEH		Tetlin Airport (FAA: 3T4)	Tetlin, Alaska, United States
TEI	VETJ	Tezu Airport	Tezu, Arunachal Pradesh, India
TEK	PAKA	Tatitlek Airport (FAA: 7KA)	Tatitlek, Alaska, United States
TEL	WBKE	Telupid Airport	Telupid, Sabah, Malaysia
TEM	YTEM	Temora Airport	Temora, New South Wales, Australia
TEN	ZUTR	Tongren Fenghuang Airport	Tongren, Guizhou, China
TEO		Terapo Airport	Terapo, Papua New Guinea
TEP		Teptep Airport	Teptep, Papua New Guinea
TEQ	LTBU	Tekirdağ Çorlu Airport	Tekirdağ, Turkey
TER	LPLA	Lajes Airport	Terceira Island, Azores, Portugal
TES	HHTS	Teseney Airport	Teseney, Eritrea
TET	FQTT	Chingozi Airport	Tete, Mozambique
TEU	NZMO	Te Anau Airport (Manapouri Airport)	Te Anau, New Zealand
TEV	LETL	Teruel Airport	Teruel, Aragon, Spain
TEX	KTEX	Telluride Regional Airport	Telluride, Colorado, United States
TEY	BITE	Thingeyri Airport	Thingeyri (Þingeyri), Iceland
TEZ	VETZ	Tezpur Airport	Tezpur, Assam, India
-TF-
TFB		Tifalmin Airport	Tifalmin, Papua New Guinea
TFF	SBTF	Tefé Airport	Tefé, Amazonas, Brazil
TFI	AYTU	Tufi Airport	Tufi, Papua New Guinea
TFL	SNTO	Teófilo Otoni Airport (Juscelino Kubitscheck Airport)	Teófilo Otoni, Minas Gerais, Brazil
TFM	AYTE	Telefomin Airport	Telefomin, Papua New Guinea
TFN	GCXO	Tenerife–North Airport (Los Rodeos Airport)	Tenerife, Canary Islands, Spain
TFR	HE13	Wadi al Jandali Airport	10th of Ramadan City, Egypt
TFS	GCTS	Tenerife–South Airport (Reina Sofia Airport)	Tenerife, Canary Islands, Spain
TFT		Taftan Airport	Taftan, Pakistan
TFU		Chengdu Tianfu International Airport	Jianyang, Chengdu, China
-TG-
TGA	WSAT	Tengah Air Base	Singapore
TGB		Tagbita Airport	Rizal, Philippines
TGC	WBTM	Tanjung Manis Airport	Tanjung Manis, Sarawak, Malaysia
TGD	LYPG	Podgorica Airport	Podgorica, Montenegro
TGE		Sharpe Field (FAA: AL73)	Tuskegee, Alabama, United States
TGG	WMKN	Sultan Mahmud Airport	Kuala Terengganu, Terengganu, Malaysia
TGH	NVST	Tongoa Airport	Tongoa, Shefa, Vanuatu
TGI	SPGM	Tingo María Airport	Tingo María, Peru
TGJ	NWWA	Tiga Airport	Tiga Island, Loyalty Islands, New Caledonia
TGK	URRT	Taganrog Airport	Taganrog, Rostov Oblast, Russia
TGL		Tagula Airport	Vanatinai (Tagula Island), Papua New Guinea
TGM	LRTM	Târgu Mureș International Airport	Târgu Mureș, Romania
TGN	YLTV	Latrobe Regional Airport	Traralgon, Victoria, Australia
TGO	ZBTL	Tongliao Airport	Tongliao, Inner Mongolia, China
TGP	UNIP	Podkamennaya Tunguska Airport	Bor, Krasnoyarsk Krai, Russia
TGQ	SWTS	Tangará da Serra Airport	Tangará da Serra, Mato Grosso, Brazil
TGR	DAUK	Sidi Mahdi Airport	Touggourt, Algeria
TGS		Chokwe Airport	Chokwe, Mozambique
TGT	HTTG	Tanga Airport	Tanga, Tanzania
TGU	MHTG	Toncontín International Airport	Tegucigalpa, Honduras
TGV	LBTG	Targovishte Airport (Buhovtsi Airfield)	Targovishte, Bulgaria
TGZ	MMTG	Ángel Albino Corzo International Airport	Tuxtla Gutiérrez, Chiapas, Mexico
-TH-
THA	KTHA	Tullahoma Regional Airport (William Northern Field)	Tullahoma, Tennessee, United States
THB	FXTA	Thaba Tseka Airport	Thaba-Tseka, Lesotho
THC	GLTN	Tchien Airport	Tchien, Liberia
THD	VVTX	Tho Xuan Airport	Thanh Hóa, Vietnam
THE	SBTE	Teresina–Senador Petrônio Portella Airport	Teresina, Piauí, Brazil
THG	YTNG	Thangool Airport	Thangool, Queensland, Australia
THH		Taharoa Aerodrome	Taharoa, New Zealand
THI	GQNC	Tichitt Airport	Tichit, Mauritania
THK	VLTK	Thakhek Airport	Thakhek, Laos
THL	VYTL	Tachilek Airport	Tachileik (Tachilek), Myanmar
THM	KTHM	Thompson Falls Airport	Thompson Falls, Montana, United States
THN	ESGT	Trollhättan–Vänersborg Airport	Trollhättan / Vänersborg, Sweden
THO	BITN	Thorshofn Airport	Thorshofn (Þórshöfn), Iceland
THP	KTHP	Hot Springs County–Thermopolis Municipal Airport	Thermopolis, Wyoming, United States
THQ	ZLTS	Tianshui Maijishan Airport	Tianshui, Gansu, China
THR	OIII	Mehrabad International Airport	Tehran, Iran
THS	VTPO	Sukhothai Airport	Sukhothai, Thailand
THT	GQNT	Tamchakett Airport	Tamchakett, Mauritania
THU	BGTL	Pituffik Space Base	Pituffik, Greenland
THV	KTHV	York Airport	York, Pennsylvania, United States
THW		Trincomalee Harbour Seaplane Base	Trincomalee, Sri Lanka
THX	UOTT	Turukhansk Airport	Turukhansk, Krasnoyarsk Krai, Russia
THY	FATH	P.R. Mphephu Airport	Thohoyandou, South Africa
THZ	DRRT	Tahoua Airport	Tahoua, Niger
-TI-
TIA	LATI	Tirana International Airport Nënë Tereza	Tirana, Albania
TIB	SKTB	Tibú Airport	Tibú, Colombia
TIC		Tinak Airport (FAA: N18)	Tinak Island, Arno Atoll, Marshall Islands
TID	DAOB	Abdelhafid Boussouf Bou Chekif Airport	Tiaret, Algeria
TIE	HATP	Tippi Airport	Tepi (Tippi), Ethiopia
TIF	OETF	Ta'if Regional Airport	Ta'if, Saudi Arabia
TIG		Tingwon Airport	Tingwon, Papua New Guinea
TIH	NTGC	Tikehau Airport	Tikehau, Tuamotus, French Polynesia
TII	OATN	Tarinkot Airport	Tarinkot (Tarin Kowt), Afghanistan
TIJ	MMTJ	Tijuana International Airport	Tijuana, Baja California, Mexico
TIK	KTIK	Tinker Air Force Base	Oklahoma City, Oklahoma, United States
TIL		Cheadle Airport (TC: CFQ4)	Cheadle, Alberta, Canada
TIM	WABP	Mozes Kilangin Airport	Tembagapura / Timika, Indonesia
TIN	DAOF	Tindouf Airport	Tindouf, Algeria
TIO	VYHN	Tilin Airport	Htilin (Tilin), Myanmar
TIP	HLLT	Tripoli International Airport	Tripoli, Libya
TIQ	PGWT	Tinian International Airport (West Tinian Airport) (FAA: TNI)	Tinian, Northern Mariana Islands
TIR	VOTP	Tirupati Airport	Tirupati, Andhra Pradesh, India
TIS		Thursday Island Airport	Thursday Island, Australia
TIU	NZTU	Richard Pearse Airport	Timaru, New Zealand
TIV	LYTV	Tivat Airport	Tivat, Montenegro
TIW	KTIW	Tacoma Narrows Airport	Tacoma, Washington, United States
TIX	KTIX	Space Coast Regional Airport	Titusville, Florida, United States
TIY	GQND	Tidjikja Airport	Tidjikja, Mauritania
TIZ	AYTA	Tari Airport	Tari, Papua New Guinea
-TJ-
TJA	SLTJ	Capitán Oriel Lea Plaza Airport	Tarija, Bolivia
TJB	WIBT	Sei Bati Airport	Tanjung Balai, Indonesia
TJC		Ticantiquí Airport	Ticantiquí, Panama
TJG	WAON	Warukin Airport	Tanjung, Indonesia
TJH	RJBT	Tajima Airport	Toyooka, Honshu, Japan
TJI	MHTJ	Trujillo Airport (Capiro Airport)	Trujillo, Honduras
TJK	LTAW	Tokat Airport	Tokat, Turkey
TJL	SBTG	Plínio Alarcom Airport	Três Lagoas, Mato Grosso do Sul, Brazil
TJM	USTR	Roshchino International Airport	Tyumen, Tyumen Oblast, Russia
TJN	NTKM	Takume Airport	Takume, Tuamotus, French Polynesia
TJQ	WIKD	H.A.S. Hanandjoeddin Airport (Buluh Tumbang Airport)	Tanjung Pandan, Indonesia
TJS	WAGD	Tanjung Harapan Airport	Tanjung Selor, Indonesia
TJU	UTDK	Kulob Airport	Kulob, Tajikistan
TJV	VOTJ	Thanjavur Air Force Station	Thanjavur, Tamil Nadu, India
-TK-
TKA	PATK	Talkeetna Airport	Talkeetna, Alaska, United States
TKB		Tekadu Airport	Tekadu, Papua New Guinea
TKC	FKKC	Tiko Airport	Tiko, Cameroon
TKD	DGTK	Takoradi Airport	Sekondi-Takoradi, Ghana
TKE		Tenakee Seaplane Base	Tenakee Springs, Alaska, United States
TKF	KTRK	Truckee Tahoe Airport (FAA: TRK)	Truckee, California, United States
TKG	WILL	Radin Inten II Airport	Bandar Lampung, Indonesia
TKH	VTPI	Takhli Royal Thai Air Force Base	Takhli, Thailand
TKI		Tokeen Seaplane Base (FAA: 57A)	Tokeen, Alaska, United States
TKJ	PFTO	Tok Junction Airport (FAA: 6K8)	Tok, Alaska, United States
TKK	PTKK	Chuuk International Airport	Chuuk, Federated States of Micronesia
TKL		Taku Lodge Seaplane Base	Taku Lodge, Alaska, United States
TKN	RJKN	Tokunoshima Airport	Tokunoshima, Amami Islands, Japan
TKO	FXTK	Tlokoeng Airport	Tlokoeng, Lesotho
TKP	NTGT	Takapoto Airport	Takapoto, Tuamotus, French Polynesia
TKQ	HTKA	Kigoma Airport	Kigoma, Tanzania
TKR	VGSG	Thakurgaon Airport	Thakurgaon, Bangladesh
TKS	RJOS	Tokushima Airport	Tokushima, Shikoku, Japan
TKT	VTPT	Tak Airport	Tak, Thailand
TKU	EFTU	Turku Airport	Turku, Finland
TKV	NTGO	Tatakoto Airport	Tatakoto, Tuamotus, French Polynesia
TKW	AYTN	Tekin Airport	Tekin, Papua New Guinea
TKX	NTKR	Takaroa Airport	Takaroa, Tuamotus, French Polynesia
TKY	YTKY	Turkey Creek Airport	Warmun (Turkey Creek), Western Australia, Australia
TKZ	NZTO	Tokoroa Aerodrome	Tokoroa, New Zealand
-TL-
TLA	PATE	Teller Airport (FAA: TER)	Teller, Alaska, United States
TLB	OPTA	Tarbela Dam Airport	Tarbela Dam, Pakistan
TLC	MMTO	Licenciado Adolfo López Mateos International Airport	Toluca, State of Mexico, Mexico
TLD	FBTL	Tuli Lodge Airport	Tuli Lodge, Botswana
TLE	FMST	Toliara Airport	Toliara, Madagascar
TLF		Telida Airport (FAA: 2K5)	Telida, Alaska, United States
TLG	AGTI	Tulaghi Heliport	Tulagi, Solomon Islands
TLH	KTLH	Tallahassee International Airport	Tallahassee, Florida, United States
TLI	WAMI	Sultan Bantilan Airport (Lalos Airport)	Tolitoli, Indonesia
TLJ	PATL	Tatalina LRRS Airport	Tatalina, Alaska, United States
TLK	UECT	Talakan Airport	Talakan, Yakutia, Russia
TLL	EETN	Tallinn Airport (Lennart Meri Tallinn Airport)	Tallinn, Estonia
TLM	DAON	Zenata – Messali El Hadj Airport	Tlemcen, Algeria
TLN	LFTH	Toulon–Hyères Airport (Hyères Le Palyvestre Airport)	Toulon / Hyères, Provence-Alpes-Côte d'Azur, France
TLO		Tol Airport	Tol, Papua New Guinea
TLP		Tumolbil Airport	Tumolbil, Papua New Guinea
TLQ	ZWTP	Turpan Jiaohe Airport	Turpan, Xinjiang, China
TLR	KTLR	Mefford Field Airport	Tulare, California, United States
TLS	LFBO	Toulouse–Blagnac Airport	Toulouse, Midi-Pyrénées, France
TLT		Tuluksak Airport	Tuluksak, Alaska, United States
TLU	SKTL	Golfo de Morrosquillo Airport	Tolú, Colombia
TLV	LLBG	Ben Gurion Airport	Tel Aviv, Israel
TLW	AYVL	Talasea Airport	Talasea, Papua New Guinea
TLX	SCTL	Panguilemo Airport	Talca, Chile
TLY	UHWP	Plastun Airport	Plastun, Primorsky Krai, Russia
TLZ	SWKT	Catalão Airport	Catalão, Goiás, Brazil
-TM-
TMA	KTMA	Henry Tift Myers Airport	Tifton, Georgia, United States
TMB	KTMB	Miami Executive Airport	Miami, Florida, United States
TMC	WATK	Tambolaka Airport (Waikabubak Airport)	Tambolaka, Indonesia
TMD	GQNH	Timbedra Airport	Timbédra, Mauritania
TME	SKTM	Gabriel Vargas Santos Airport	Tame, Colombia
TMF	VRNT	Thimarafushi Airport	Thimarafushi, Thaa Atoll, Maldives
TMG	WBKM	Tommanggong Airport	Tommanggong, Sabah, Malaysia
TMH	WAKT	Tanah Merah Airport	Tanahmerah, Indonesia
TMI	VNTR	Tumlingtar Airport	Tumlingtar, Nepal
TMJ	UTST	Termez Airport	Termez, Uzbekistan
TMK		Tam Kỳ Airport	Tam Kỳ, Vietnam
TML	DGLE	Tamale Airport	Tamale, Ghana
TMM	FMMT	Toamasina Airport	Toamasina, Madagascar
TMN	NGTM	Tamana Airport	Tamana, Kiribati
TMO	SVTM	Tumeremo Airport	Tumeremo, Venezuela
TMP	EFTP	Tampere–Pirkkala Airport	Tampere, Finland
TMQ	DFEM	Tambao Airport	Tambao, Burkina Faso
TMR	DAAT	Aguenar – Hadj Bey Akhamok Airport	Tamanrasset, Algeria
TMS	FPST	São Tomé International Airport	São Tomé, São Tomé and Príncipe
TMT	SBTB	Porto Trombetas Airport	Porto Trombetas / Oriximiná, Pará, Brazil
TMU	MRTR	Tambor Airport	Tambor, Costa Rica
TMW	YSTW	Tamworth Airport	Tamworth, New South Wales, Australia
TMX	DAUT	Timimoun Airport	Timimoun, Algeria
TMY		Tiom Airport	Tiom, Indonesia
TMZ	NZTH	Thames Aerodrome	Thames, New Zealand
-TN-
TNA	ZSJN	Jinan Yaoqiang International Airport	Jinan, Shandong, China
TNB	WRLH	Tanah Grogot Airport	Tanah Grogot, Indonesia
TNC	PATC	Tin City LRRS Airport	Tin City, Alaska, United States
TND	MUTD	Alberto Delgado Airport	Trinidad, Cuba
TNE	RJFG	New Tanegashima Airport	Tanegashima, Ōsumi Islands, Japan
TNF	LFPN	Toussus-le-Noble Airport	Toussus-le-Noble, Île-de-France, France
TNG	GMTT	Tangier Ibn Battouta Airport	Tangier, Morocco
TNH	ZYTN	Tonghua Sanyuanpu Airport	Tonghua, Jilin, China
TNI	VIST	Satna Airport	Satna, Madhya Pradesh, India
TNJ	WIDN	Raja Haji Fisabilillah Airport	Tanjung Pinang, Indonesia
TNK		Tununak Airport (FAA: 4KA)	Tununak, Alaska, United States
TNL	UKLT	Ternopil International Airport	Ternopil, Ukraine
TNM	SCRM	Teniente R. Marsh Airport	King George Island, Antarctica
TNN	RCNN	Tainan Airport	Tainan, Taiwan
TNO	MRTM	Tamarindo Airport	Tamarindo, Costa Rica
TNP	KTNP	Twentynine Palms Airport	Twentynine Palms, California, United States
TNQ		Teraina Airport	Teraina, Kiribati
TNR	FMMI	Ivato International Airport	Antananarivo, Madagascar
TNS		Tungsten (Cantung) Airport (TC: CBX5)	Tungsten, Northwest Territories, Canada
TNT	KTNT	Dade-Collier Training and Transition Airport	Miami, Florida, United States
TNU	KTNU	Newton Municipal Airport	Newton, Iowa, United States
TNV		Tabuaeran Island Airport	Tabuaeran, Kiribati
TNW	SEJD	Jumandy Airport	Tena, Ecuador
TNX	VDST	Steung Treng Airport	Stung Treng, Cambodia
TNZ	ZMTL	Tosontsengel Airport	Tosontsengel, Mongolia
-TO-
TOA	KTOA	Zamperini Field	Torrance, California, United States
TOB	HLGN	Tobruk Airport	Tobruk, Libya
TOC	KTOC	Toccoa Airport (R.G. LeTourneau Field)	Toccoa, Georgia, United States
TOD	WMBT	Tioman Airport	Tioman Island, Pahang, Malaysia
TOE	DTTZ	Tozeur–Nefta International Airport	Tozeur, Tunisia
TOF	UNTT	Bogashevo Airport	Tomsk, Tomsk Oblast, Russia
TOG	PATG	Togiak Airport	Togiak, Alaska, United States
TOH	NVSD	Torres Airport	Torres Islands, Vanuatu
TOI	KTOI	Troy Municipal Airport	Troy, Alabama, United States
TOJ	LETO	Madrid–Torrejón Airport	Madrid, Community of Madrid, Spain
TOK		Torokina Airport	Torokina, Papua New Guinea
TOL	KTOL	Toledo Express Airport	Toledo, Ohio, United States
TOM	GATB	Timbuktu Airport	Timbuktu (Tombouctou), Mali
TON		Tonu Airport	Tonu, Papua New Guinea
TOO	MRSV	San Vito de Java Airport	San Vito, Costa Rica
TOP	KTOP	Philip Billard Municipal Airport	Topeka, Kansas, United States
TOQ	SCBE	Barriles Airport	Tocopilla, Chile
TOR	KTOR	Torrington Municipal Airport	Torrington, Wyoming, United States
TOS	ENTC	Tromsø Airport, Langnes	Tromsø, Norway
TOT	SMCO	Totness Airstrip	Totness, Suriname
TOU	NWWU	Touho Airport	Touho, New Caledonia
TOV		West End Seaplane Base	Tortola, British Overseas Territory of Virgin Islands
TOW	SBTD	Luiz dal Canalle Filho Airport	Toledo, Paraná, Brazil
TOX	USTO	Tobolsk Airport	Tobolsk, Tyumen Oblast, Russia
TOY	RJNT	Toyama Airport	Toyama, Honshu, Japan
TOZ	DITM	Mahana Airport	Touba, Ivory Coast
-TP-
TPA	KTPA	Tampa International Airport	Tampa, Florida, United States
TPC	SETR	Tarapoa Airport	Tarapoa, Ecuador
TPE	RCTP	Taiwan Taoyuan International Airport	Taoyuan, Taiwan
TPF	KTPF	Peter O. Knight Airport	Tampa, Florida, United States
TPG	WMBI	Taiping Airport	Taiping, Perak, Malaysia
TPH	KTPH	Tonopah Airport	Tonopah, Nevada, United States
TPI	AYTI	Tapini Airport	Tapini, Papua New Guinea
TPJ	VNTJ	Taplejung Airport	Taplejung, Nepal
TPK	WITA	Teuku Cut Ali Airport	Tapaktuan, Indonesia
TPL	KTPL	Draughon–Miller Central Texas Regional Airport	Temple, Texas, United States
TPN	SETI	Tiputini Airport	Tiputini, Ecuador
TPP	SPST	Cad. FAP Guillermo del Castillo Paredes Airport	Tarapoto, Peru
TPQ	MMEP	Amado Nervo International Airport	Tepic, Nayarit, Mexico
TPR	YTMP	Tom Price Airport	Tom Price, Western Australia, Australia
TPS	LICT	Vincenzo Florio Airport Trapani–Birgi	Trapani, Sicily, Italy
TPT		Tapeta Airport	Tapeta, Liberia
TPU	VNTP	Tikapur Airport	Tikapur, Nepal
TPX	NTTU	Tupai Airport	Tūpai, Society Islands, French Polynesia
-TQ-
TQD	ORAT	Al-Taqaddum Air Base	Fallujah, Iraq
TQL	USDS	Tarko-Sale Airport	Tarko-Sale, Yamalo-Nenets Autonomous Okrug, Russia
TQN	OATQ	Taloqan Airport	Taloqan, Afghanistan
TQO	MMTU	Tulum International Airport	Tulum, Quintana Roo, Mexico
TQP	YTEE	Trepell Airport	Trepell, Queensland, Australia
TQQ		Maranggo Airport	Tomia Island, Indonesia
TQS	SKTQ	Captain Ernesto Esguerra Cubides Air Base	Tres Esquinas, Colombia
-TR-
TRA	RORT	Tarama Airport	Tarama, Miyako Islands, Japan
TRB	SKTU	Gonzalo Mejía Airport	Turbo, Colombia
TRC	MMTC	Francisco Sarabia International Airport (Torreón Int'l)	Torreón, Coahuila, Mexico
TRD	ENVA	Trondheim Airport, Værnes	Trondheim, Norway
TRE	EGPU	Tiree Airport	Tiree, Scotland, United Kingdom
TRF	ENTO	Sandefjord Airport, Torp	Sandefjord / Oslo, Norway
TRG	NZTG	Tauranga Airport	Tauranga, New Zealand
TRH		Trona Airport (FAA: L72)	Trona, California, United States
TRI	KTRI	Tri-Cities Regional Airport	Bristol / Johnson City / Kingsport, Tennessee, United States
TRJ	AYTT	Tarakbits Airport	Tarakbits, Papua New Guinea
TRK	WALR	Juwata International Airport	Tarakan, Indonesia
TRL	KTRL	Terrell Municipal Airport	Terrell, Texas, United States
TRM	KTRM	Jacqueline Cochran Regional Airport	Thermal, California, United States
TRN	LIMF	Turin Airport (Caselle Airport)	Turin, Piedmont, Italy
TRO	YTRE	Taree Airport	Taree, New South Wales, Australia
TRQ	SBTK	José Galera dos Santos Airport	Tarauacá, Acre, Brazil
TRR	VCCT	China Bay Airport	Trincomalee, Sri Lanka
TRS	LIPQ	Trieste Airport (Ronchi dei Legionari Airport)	Trieste, Friuli-Venezia Giulia, Italy
TRU	SPRU	FAP Captain Carlos Martínez de Pinillos International Airport	Trujillo, Peru
TRV	VOTV	Trivandrum International Airport	Thiruvananthapuram, Kerala, India
TRW	NGTA	Bonriki International Airport	Tarawa, Kiribati
TRX	KTRX	Trenton Municipal Airport	Trenton, Missouri, United States
TRY	HUTO	Tororo Airport	Tororo, Uganda
TRZ	VOTR	Tiruchirappalli International Airport	Tiruchirappalli (Tiruchchirappalli), Tamil Nadu, India
-TS-
TSA	RCSS	Taipei Songshan Airport	Taipei, Taiwan
TSB	FYTM	Tsumeb Airport	Tsumeb, Namibia
TSC	SETH	Taisha Airport	Taisha, Ecuador
TSD		Tshipise Airport	Tshipise, South Africa
TSF	LIPH	Treviso-Sant'Angelo Airport	Treviso / Venice, Veneto, Italy
TSG		Tanacross Airport	Tanacross, Alaska, United States
TSH	FZUK	Tshikapa Airport	Tshikapa, Democratic Republic of the Congo
TSI		Tsile Tsile Airport	Tsili Tsili (Tsile Tsile), Papua New Guinea
TSJ	RJDT	Tsushima Airport	Tsushima, Tsushima Island, Japan
TSK		Taskul Airport	Taskul, Papua New Guinea
TSL	MMTN	Tamuín National Airport	Tamuín, San Luis Potosí, Mexico
TSM	KSKX	Taos Regional Airport (FAA: SKX)	Taos, New Mexico, United States
TSN	ZBTJ	Tianjin Binhai International Airport	Tianjin, China
TSP	KTSP	Tehachapi Municipal Airport	Tehachapi, California, United States
TSQ	SBTR	Torres Airport	Torres, Rio Grande do Sul, Brazil
TSR	LRTR	Timișoara Traian Vuia International Airport	Timișoara, Romania
TST	VTST	Trang Airport	Trang, Thailand
TSU	NGTS	Tabiteuea South Airport	Tabiteuea South, Kiribati
TSV	YBTL	Townsville Airport	Townsville, Queensland, Australia
TSW		Tsewi Airport	Tsewi, Papua New Guinea
TSY	WICM	Tasikmalaya Airport (Wiriadinata Airport)	Tasikmalaya, West Java, Indonesia
TSX	WRLT	Tanjung Santan Airport	Tanjung Santan, Indonesia
TSZ	ZMTG	Tsetserleg Airport	Tsetserleg, Mongolia
-TT-
TTA	GMAT	Tan Tan Airport (Plage Blanche Airport)	Tan-Tan, Morocco
TTB	LIET	Tortolì Airport (Arbatax Airport)	Tortolì, Sardinia, Italy
TTC	SCTT	Las Breas Airport	Taltal, Chile
TTD	KTTD	Portland–Troutdale Airport	Portland, Oregon, United States
TTE	WAEE	Sultan Babullah Airport	Ternate, Indonesia
TTG	SAST	Tartagal "General Enrique Mosconi" Airport	Tartagal, Salta, Argentina
TTH	OOTH	RAFO Thumrait	Thumrait, Oman
TTI	NTTE	Tetiaroa Airport	Tetiaroa, Society Islands, French Polynesia
TTJ	RJOR	Tottori Airport	Tottori, Honshu, Japan
TTL		Turtle Island Seaplane Base	Nanuya Levu, Fiji
TTM		Tablón de Tamará Airport	Tablón de Tamará, Colombia
TTN	KTTN	Trenton–Mercer Airport	Trenton, New Jersey, United States
TTO	KBTN	Britton Municipal Airport (FAA: BTN)	Britton, South Dakota, United States
TTQ	MRBT	Tortuguero Airport (Barra de Tortuguero Airport)	Tortuguero, Costa Rica
TTR	WAWT	Pongtiku Airport	Tana Toraja, Indonesia
TTS	FMNT	Tsaratanana Airport	Tsaratanana, Madagascar
TTT	RCFN	Taitung Airport (Taitung Fongnian Airport)	Taitung, Taiwan
TTU		Sania Ramel Airport	Tétouan, Morocco
TTW		Tissa Tank Waterdrome	Tissamaharama, Sri Lanka
TTX	YTST	Truscott-Mungalalu Airport	Mungalalu, Western Australia, Australia
-TU-
TUA	SETU	Teniente Coronel Luis a Mantilla International Airport	Tulcán, Ecuador
TUB	NTAT	Tubuai – Mataura Airport	Tubuai, French Polynesia
TUC	SANT	Teniente General Benjamín Matienzo International Airport	San Miguel de Tucumán, Tucumán, Argentina
TUD	GOTT	Tambacounda Airport	Tambacounda, Senegal
TUF	LFOT	Tours Val de Loire Airport	Tours, Centre-Val de Loire, France
TUG	RPUT	Tuguegarao Airport	Tuguegarao, Philippines
TUI	OETR	Turaif Domestic Airport	Turaif, Saudi Arabia
TUJ	HAMJ	Tum Airport	Tum, Ethiopia
TUK	OPTU	Turbat International Airport	Turbat, Pakistan
TUL	KTUL	Tulsa International Airport	Tulsa, Oklahoma, United States
TUM	YTMU	Tumut Airport	Tumut, New South Wales, Australia
TUN	DTTA	Tunis–Carthage International Airport	Tunis, Tunisia
TUO	NZAP	Taupō Airport	Taupō, New Zealand
TUP	KTUP	Tupelo Regional Airport	Tupelo, Mississippi, United States
TUQ	DFOT	Tougan Airport	Tougan, Burkina Faso
TUR	SBTU	Tucuruí Airport	Tucuruí, Pará, Brazil
TUS	KTUS	Tucson International Airport	Tucson, Arizona, United States
TUT		Tauta Airport	Tauta, Papua New Guinea
TUU	OETB	Tabuk Regional Airport	Tabuk, Saudi Arabia
TUV	SVTC	San Rafael Airport	Tucupita, Venezuela
TUW		Tubala Airport	Tubala (Tubualá), Panama
TUX		Tumbler Ridge Airport (TC: CBX7)	Tumbler Ridge, British Columbia, Canada
TUY		Tulum Airport	Tulum, Quintana Roo, Mexico
TUZ		Tucumã Airport	Tucumã, Pará, Brazil
-TV-
TVA	FMMR	Morafenobe Airport	Morafenobe, Madagascar
TVC	KTVC	Cherry Capital Airport	Traverse City, Michigan, United States
TVF	KTVF	Thief River Falls Regional Airport	Thief River Falls, Minnesota, United States
TVI	KTVI	Thomasville Regional Airport	Thomasville, Georgia, United States
TVL	KTVL	Lake Tahoe Airport	South Lake Tahoe, California, United States
TVS	ZBTS	Tangshan Sannühe Airport	Tangshan, Hebei, China
TVU	NFNM	Matei Airport	Taveuni, Fiji
TVY	VYDW	Dawei Airport	Dawei, Myanmar
-TW-
TWA		Twin Hills Airport (FAA: A63)	Twin Hills, Alaska, United States
TWB	YTWB	Toowoomba City Aerodrome	Toowoomba, Queensland, Australia
TWC		Tumxuk Tangwangcheng Airport	Tumxuk, Xinjiang, China
TWD		Jefferson County International Airport (FAA: 0S9)	Port Townsend, Washington, United States
TWE		Taylor Airport (FAA: AK49)	Taylor, Alaska, United States
TWF	KTWF	Magic Valley Regional Airport (Joslin Field)	Twin Falls, Idaho, United States
TWN		Tewantin Airport	Tewantin, Queensland, Australia
TWP		Torwood Airport	Torwood, Queensland, Australia
TWT	RPMN	Sanga-Sanga Airport	Tawitawi Island (Tawi-Tawi), Philippines
TWU	WBKW	Tawau Airport	Tawau, Sabah, Malaysia
TWY		Tawa Airport	Tawa, Papua New Guinea
TWZ	NZUK	Pukaki Airport (Twizel Airport)	Twizel, New Zealand
-TX-
TXE	WITK	Rembele Airport	Takengon, Sumatra, Indonesia
TXF	SNTF	Teixeira de Freitas Airport (9 de maio Airport)	Teixeira de Freitas, Bahia, Brazil
TXK	KTXK	Texarkana Regional Airport (Webb Field)	Texarkana, Arkansas, United States
TXM	WAST	Teminabuan Airport	Teminabuan, Indonesia
TXN	ZSTX	Huangshan Tunxi International Airport	Huangshan, Anhui, China
TXR		Tanbar Airport	Tanbar, Queensland, Australia
TXU	DITB	Tabou Airport	Tabou, Ivory Coast
-TY-
TYA	UUBT	Klokovo Airport	Tula, Tula Oblast, Russia
TYB	YTIB	Tibooburra Airport	Tibooburra, New South Wales, Australia
TYD	UHBW	Tynda Airport	Tynda, Amur Oblast, Russia
TYE		Tyonek Airport	Tyonek, Alaska, United States
TYF	ESST	Torsby Airport	Torsby, Sweden
TYG		Thylungra Airport	Thylungra, Queensland, Australia
TYL	SPYL	Capitán FAP Víctor Montes Arias International Airport	Talara, Peru
TYM	MYES	Staniel Cay Airport	Staniel Cay, Exuma Islands, Bahamas
TYN	ZBYN	Taiyuan Wusu International Airport	Taiyuan, Shanxi, China
TYO		metropolitan area^{2}	Tokyo, Honshu, Japan
TYP	YTMY	Tobermorey Airport	Tobermorey, Northern Territory, Australia
TYR	KTYR	Tyler Pounds Regional Airport	Tyler, Texas, United States
TYS	KTYS	McGhee Tyson Airport	Knoxville, Tennessee, United States
TYT	SUTR	Treinta y Tres Airport	Treinta y Tres, Uruguay
TYZ	KTYL	Taylor Airport (FAA: TYL)	Taylor, Arizona, United States
-TZ-
TZA	MZBZ	Belize City Municipal Airport	Belize City, Belize
TZC	KCFS	Tuscola Area Airport (FAA: CFS)	Caro, Michigan, United States
TZL	LQTZ	Tuzla International Airport	Tuzla, Bosnia and Herzegovina
TZM		Cupul National Airport	Tizimín, Yucatán, Mexico
TZN	MYAK	South Andros Airport (Congo Town Airport)	South Andros, Andros Island, Bahamas
TZO		Tsimiroro Airport	Ankisatra, Madagascar
TZX	LTCG	Trabzon Airport	Trabzon, Turkey

== Notes ==
- ^1 TCI is common IATA code for Tenerife–South Airport (IATA: TFS) and Tenerife–North Airport (IATA: TFN).
- ^2 TYO is common IATA code for Narita International Airport (IATA: NRT), Haneda Airport (IATA: HND) and Yokota Air Base (IATA: OKO).
