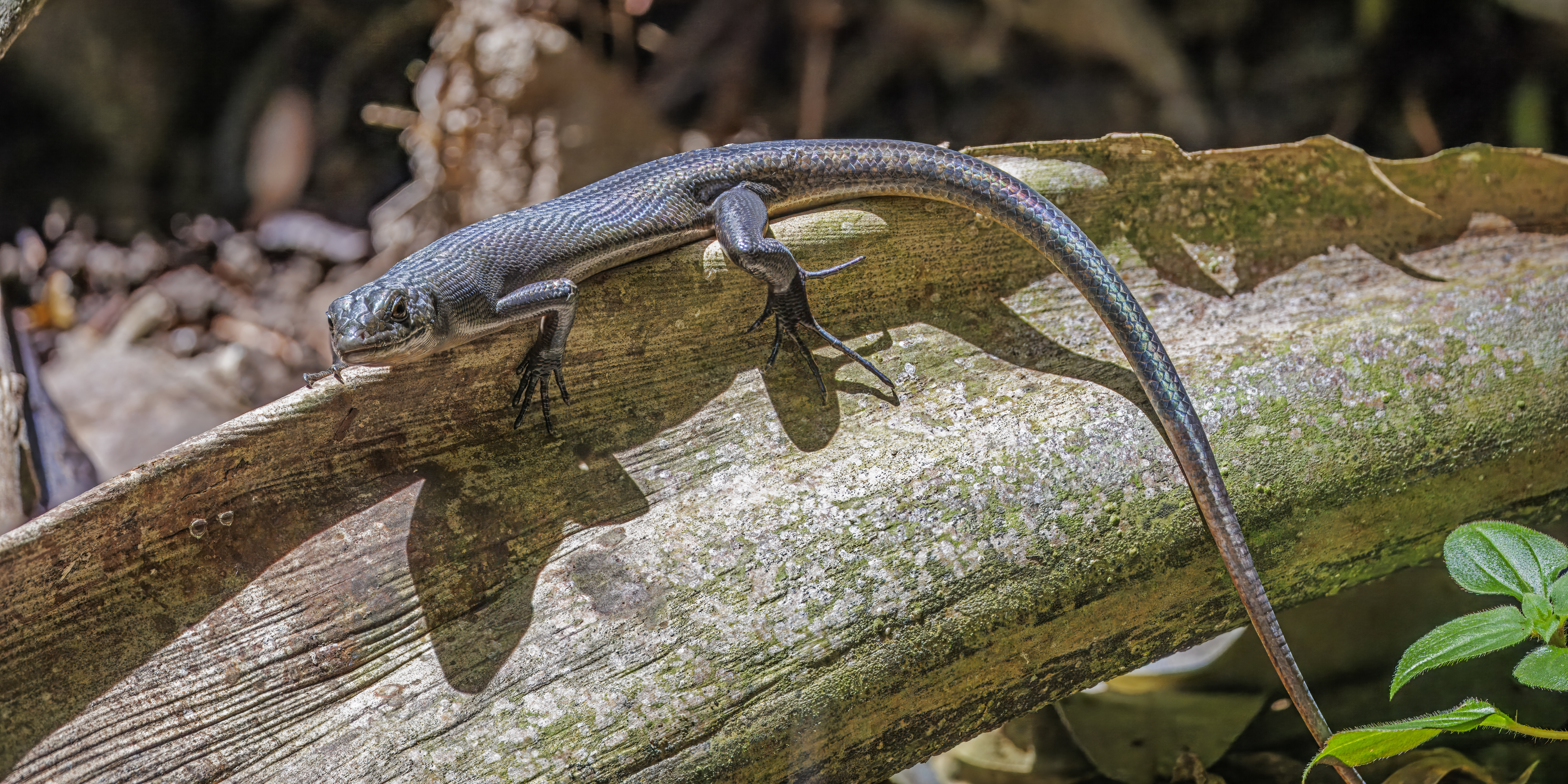
- On Upolu, Samoa

Conservation status
- Least Concern (IUCN 3.1)

Scientific classification
- Kingdom: Animalia
- Phylum: Chordata
- Class: Reptilia
- Order: Squamata
- Suborder: Scinciformata
- Infraorder: Scincomorpha
- Family: Eugongylidae
- Genus: Emoia
- Species: E. nigra

Binomial name
- Emoia nigra (Jacquinot & Guichenot, 1853)

= Emoia nigra =

Species of lizard

Emoia nigra, the black emo skink, is a species of lizard in the family Scincidae. It is found from the Solomon Islands, Vanuatu, eastward through Fiji to Tonga, Samoa, Toga, Lo, Tegua, and Hiu Island.
