= Loh language =

Loh language may refer to:

- the Lo-Toga language, an Oceanic language of Vanuatu – more specifically, the Lo dialect spoken on the island of Lo (a.k.a. Loh)
- the Loo language, an Adamawa language of Nigeria
