= Ngwel =

Island in Torba Province, Vanuatu

- Interactive map of Ngwel

Geography
- Location: Pacific Ocean
- Coordinates: 13°15′0.4″S 166°35′13.3″E
- Archipelago: Vanuatu
- Highest elevation: 9 m (30 ft)

Administration
- Vanuatu
- Province: Torba Province

Demographics
- Population: 0 (2015)
- Ethnic groups: None

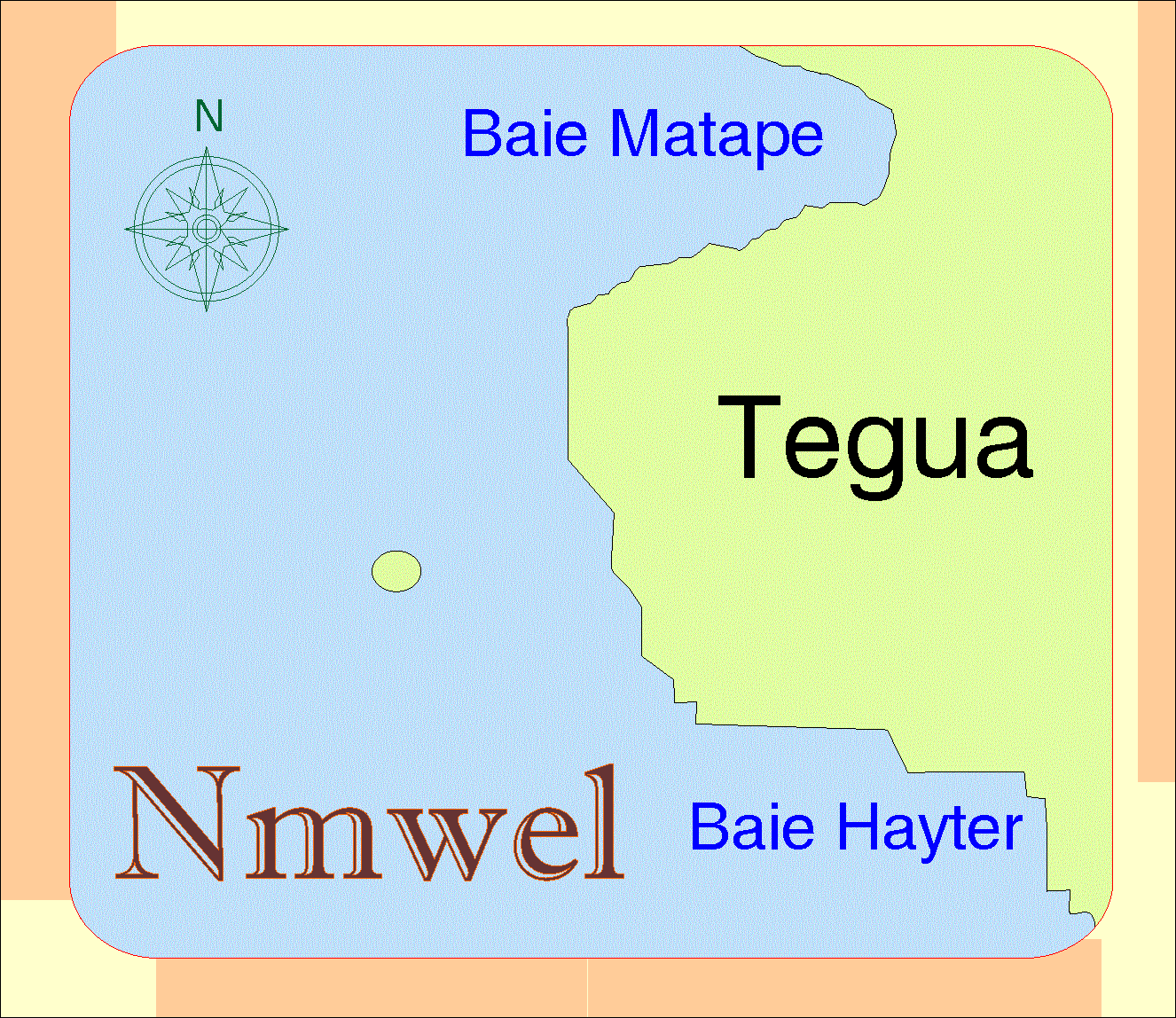

Ngwel [ŋʷel] is an uninhabited island in Torba Province of Vanuatu in the Pacific Ocean. The island is a part of the Torres Islands archipelago.

== Geography ==
Ngwel is located 600 meters off the west coast of Tegua. It is 500 m long and 200 m wide. The estimated terrain elevation above the sea level is some 9 metres.

== Name ==
The form Ngwel reflects the island's name in Lo-Toga, N̄wēl [ŋʷel]. In neighbouring Hiw, it is known as N̄wëy [ŋʷej].
