= Metoma =

Island in Vanuatu

- Interactive map of Metoma

Geography
- Location: Pacific Ocean
- Coordinates: 13°12′18.72″S 166°36′2.88″E
- Archipelago: Vanuatu
- Area: 3 km^{2} (1.2 sq mi)

Administration
- Vanuatu
- Province: Torba Province, Torres Islands
- Largest settlement: Sola

Demographics
- Population: 13 (2009)

Metoma is a small volcanic island in Torba Province of Vanuatu in the Pacific Ocean.

== Geography ==
Metoma is a part of the Torres Islands archipelago. It lies 500 km from Port Vila. The island is located between the neighboring islands of Tegua and Hiu. The summit elevation is 115 m. Metoma is populated by robber crabs (Birgus latro), the world's largest terrestrial invertebrates. The island is 2.4 km long and 1.4 km wide, and lies 600 m north of Tegua Island.

== Population ==
Metoma had 13 inhabitants in 2009. The village in the south of the island is called Rival.

== Name ==
The island is locally called Mētome [metɔmə] in Lo-Toga. The official name Metoma [metoma] is spelled according to the Mota language, which missionaries chose as a reference in the area; the latter form is conservative of the ancient form *metoma which can be reconstructed in the ancestral language of the Torres and Banks Islands.
