= Toq =

Toq or TOQ may refer to:

- Qualcomm Toq, smartwatch developed by Qualcomm
- Toq Temuer (1304–1332), or Tugh Temür, Jayaatu Khan, Emperor Wenzong of the Yuan Dynasty
- ISO 639:toq, ISO language code for Toposa language
- Barriles Airport, IATA code TOQ
- The Occidental Quarterly, American journal
