= Torres Airport =

Airport in Linua, Vanuatu

- IATA: TOH; ICAO: NVSD

Summary
- Airport type: Public
- Serves: Torres Islands, Torba, Vanuatu
- Location: Linua
- Coordinates: 13°19′39″S 166°38′18″E

Map
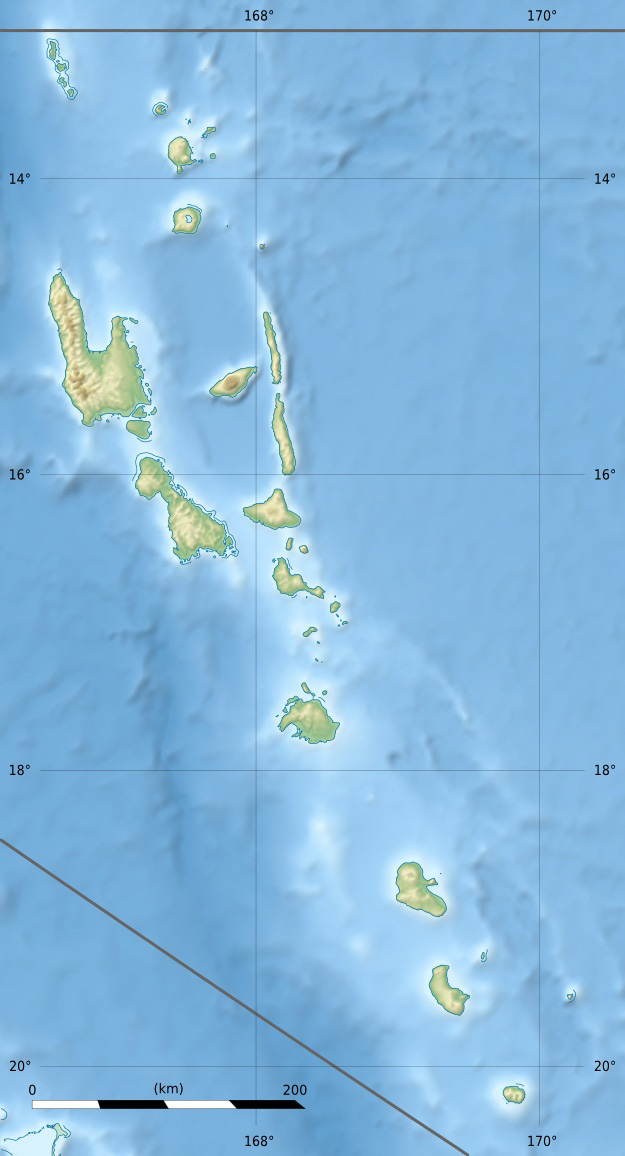
- Location of airport in Vanuatu

Torres Airport (IATA: TOH, ICAO: NVSD) is an airfield serving the Torres Islands in the Torba province in Vanuatu. It is located on Linua island, just north of Lo (or Loh) island.
