= TKW =

TKW may indicate:

- Total known weight
- Teck Whye LRT station (LRT station abbreviation TKW)
- Tekin Airport (IATA: TKW)
- To Kwa Wan station (MTR station code TKW)
- Thousand-kernel weight, the weight in grams of a thousand kernels (grains, seeds) of a given crop sample.
