= TLX (disambiguation) =

TLX may refer to:

- TLX, a protein-coding gene in the species Homo sapiens
- NASA-TLX, an assessment tool that rates perceived workload
- Acura TLX, the automobile made by Acura
- Panguilemo Airport, the IATA code TLX
- Tieling West railway station, the pinyin code TLX
- Taldi railway station, the station code TLX
- tlx, the ISO 639-3 code for Khehek language
