= Dillingham Airport =

Airport in Alaska, United States

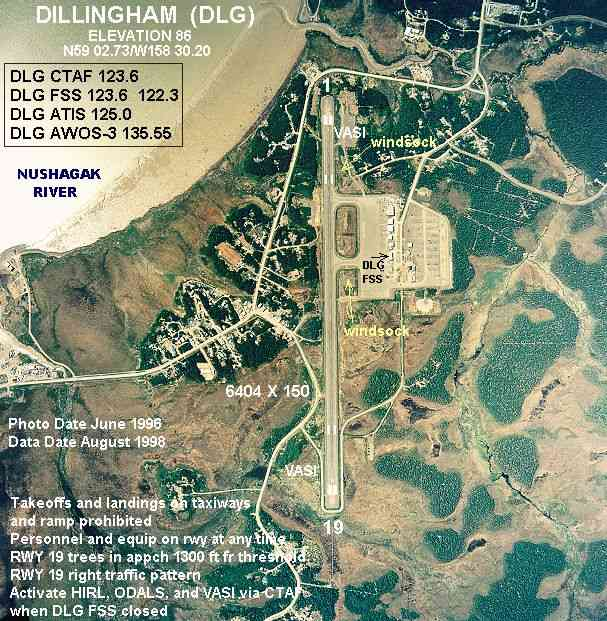
- IATA: DLG; ICAO: PADL; FAA LID: DLG

Summary
- Airport type: Public
- Owner: State of Alaska DOT&PF - Central Region
- Serves: Dillingham, Alaska
- Elevation AMSL: 81 ft (25 m)
- Coordinates: 59°02′41″N 158°30′20″W

Map
- Location of airport in Alaska

Runways
Direction	Length		Surface
Direction	ft	m	Surface
1/19	6,400	1,951	Asphalt

Statistics (2016)
- Aircraft operations: 50,892 (2015)
- Based aircraft: 59
- Passengers: 54,340
- Freight: 15,000,000 lbs
- Source: Federal Aviation Administration; Source: Bureau of Transportation

Dillingham Airport (IATA: DLG, ICAO: PADL, FAA LID: DLG) is a state-owned public-use airport located two nautical miles (4 km) west of the central business district of Dillingham, a city in the Dillingham Census Area of the U.S. state of Alaska. Scheduled passenger service is available at this airport.

As per Federal Aviation Administration records, the airport had 32,215 passenger boardings (enplanements) in calendar year 2008, 29,374 enplanements in 2009, and 42,927 in 2010. It is included in the National Plan of Integrated Airport Systems for 2011–2015, which categorized it as a primary commercial service airport (more than 10,000 enplanements per year).

== Facilities and aircraft ==
Dillingham Airport covers an area of 620 acres (251 ha) at an elevation of 81 feet (25 m) above mean sea level. It has one runway designated 1/19 with an asphalt surface measuring 6,400 by 150 feet (1,951 x 46 m).

For the 12-month period ending April 30, 2018, the airport had 50,892 aircraft operations, an average of 139 per day: 72% air taxi, 26% general aviation, and 3% scheduled commercial. At that time there were 59 aircraft based at this airport: 52 single-engine, 6 multi-engine and 1 helicopter.

== Airlines and destinations ==
Airlines	Destinations
Alaska Airlines	Anchorage
Grant Aviation	Bethel, Clarks Point, Ekwok, Emmonak, Igiugig, King Salmon, Koliganek, Levelock, Manokotak, New Stuyahok, South Naknek, Togiak, Twin Hills

=== Statistics ===
Top airlines at DLG (July 2024 – June 2025)
Rank	Airline	Passengers	Percent of market share
1	Horizon Air (Alaska Airlines)	32,210	48.68%
2	Grant Aviation	19,480	29.44%
3	Alaska Airlines	14,380	21.73%
4	Aleutian Airways	100	0.15%

Top domestic destinations: (July 2024 – June 2025)
Rank	City	Airport	Passengers	Carriers
1	(Alaska) Anchorage, AK	Ted Stevens Anchorage International Airport	23,440	Alaska
2	(Alaska) Togiak, AK	Togiak Airport	2,630	Grant
3	(Alaska) New Stuyahok, AK	New Stuyahok Airport	1,810	Grant
4	(Alaska) Manokotak, AK	Manokotak Airport	1,610	Grant
5	(Alaska) King Salmon, AK	King Salmon Airport	1,020	Grant
6	(Alaska) Koliganek, AK	Koliganek Airport	770	Grant
7	(Alaska) Twin Hills, AK	Twin Hills Airport	670	Grant
8	(Alaska) Clark's Point, AK	Clarks Point Airport	600	Grant
9	(Alaska) Ekwok, AK	Ekwok Airport	410	Grant
10	(Alaska) Levelock, AK	Levelock Airport	130	Grant

== See also ==
- List of airports in Alaska
- Shannons Pond Seaplane Base, located 3 miles (4.8 km) west of Dillingham Airport.
