= Manokotak Airport =

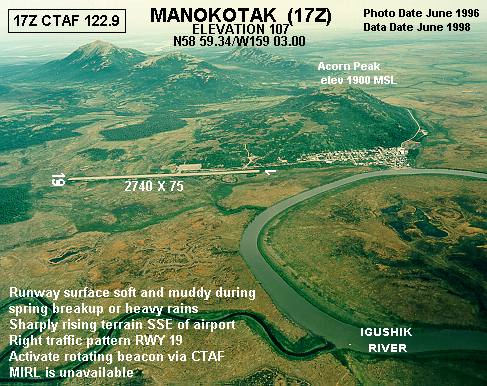
- IATA: KMO; ICAO: PAMB; FAA LID: MBA

Summary
- Airport type: Public
- Owner: State of Alaska DOT&PF - Central Region
- Serves: Manokotak, Alaska
- Elevation AMSL: 51 ft / 16 m
- Coordinates: 58°59′19″N 159°2′56″W

Map
- Location of airport in Alaska

Runways
Direction	Length		Surface
Direction	ft	m	Surface
1/19	2,720	829	Gravel

Statistics (2001)
- Aircraft operations: 1,200
- Source: Federal Aviation Administration

Manokotak Airport (IATA: KMO, ICAO: PAMB, FAA LID: MBA, formerly 17Z) is a state-owned public-use airport located one mile (2 km) north of the central business district of Manokotak, a city in the Dillingham Census Area of the U.S. state of Alaska.

Although most U.S. airports use the same three-letter location identifier for the FAA and IATA, Manokotak Airport is assigned MBA by the FAA and KMO by the IATA (which assigned MBA to Moi International Airport in Mombasa, Kenya).

== Facilities and aircraft ==
Manokotak Airport has one runway designated 1/19 with a 2,720 x 60 ft (829 x 18 m) gravel surface. For the 12-month period ending December 31, 2001, the airport had 1,200 aircraft operations: 83% air taxi and 17% general aviation.

== Airlines and destinations ==
Airlines	Destinations
Grant Aviation	Dillingham, Ekwok, Togiak, Twin Hills

== See also ==
- List of airports in Alaska
