= Shannons Pond Seaplane Base =

- IATA: none; ICAO: none; FAA LID: AA15

Summary
- Airport type: Public
- Owner: State of Alaska/Div. of Lands
- Serves: Dillingham, Alaska
- Elevation AMSL: 80 ft / 24 m
- Coordinates: 59°03′32″N 158°34′38″W

Map
- Location of airport in Alaska

Runways
Direction	Length		Surface
Direction	ft	m	Surface
NE/SW	1,400	427	Water

Statistics
- Based aircraft: 15
- Source: Federal Aviation Administration

Shannons Pond Seaplane Base (FAA LID: AA15) is a public-use seaplane base located three nautical miles (6 km) west of the central business district of Dillingham, a city in the Dillingham Census Area of the U.S. state of Alaska. As per Federal Aviation Administration records, this facility had 1,000 passenger boardings (enplanements) in calendar year 2008. It is 3 miles (5 km) west of Dillingham Airport.

== Facilities and aircraft ==
Shannons Pond Seaplane Base has one seaplane landing area designated NE/SW which measures 1,400 by 100 feet (427 x 30 m). There are 15 single-engine aircraft based at this airport.

== See also ==
- List of airports in Alaska
