= Linua =

Island in Vanuatu

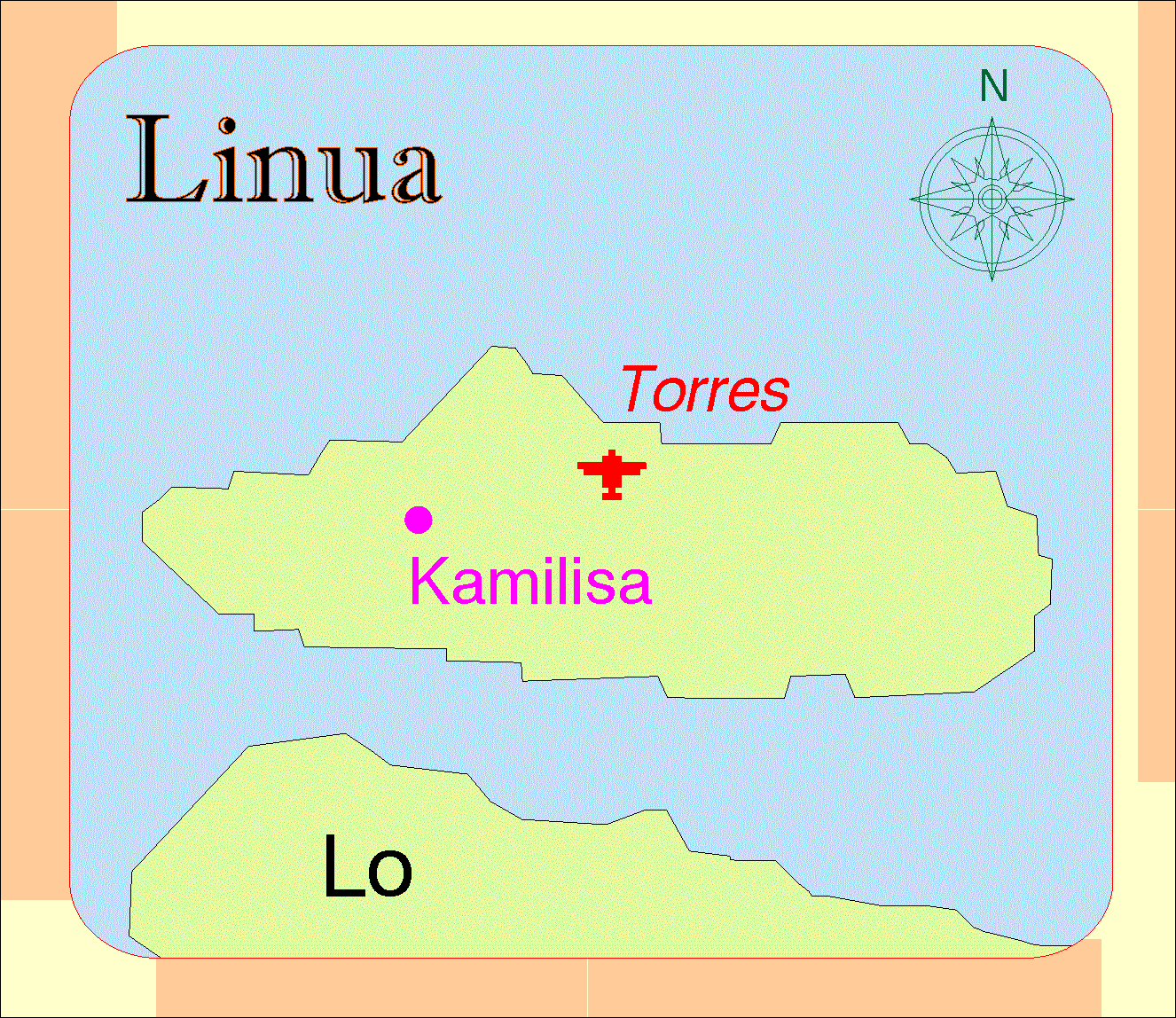

Geography
- Location: Pacific Ocean
- Coordinates: 13°19′S 166°37′E
- Archipelago: Vanuatu
- Highest elevation: 23 m (75 ft)

Administration
- Vanuatu
- Province: Torba Province

Demographics
- Population: 0 (2015)
- Ethnic groups: None

Linua is an island in the Torres Islands archipelago in Torba Province of Vanuatu in the southwestern Pacific Ocean.

== Geography ==
Linua has a length of 2.8 km and diameter of 1 km. The estimated terrain elevation above sea level is 23 meters. Linua lies about 60 miles (100 km) north of Espiritu Santo Island between islands of Tegua and Lo. The island is surrounded by coral reefs. There is an airstrip on the island opened in 1983 that provides the only regular transportation flights with the rest of Vanuatu.

The island is used mostly in times of plane landing, and is not settled permanently; the people there are based in the neighbouring village of Lungharegi, on Lo island. Linua has a small tourist hamlet, Kamilisa, consisting of four bungalows and a capacity of up to 20 people.

== Climate ==
Linua has a tropical rainforest climate (Af) with very heavy rainfall year-round.

Climate data for Linua
Month	Jan	Feb	Mar	Apr	May	Jun	Jul	Aug	Sep	Oct	Nov	Dec	Year
Mean daily maximum °C (°F)	30.2 (86.4)	30.3 (86.5)	30.0 (86.0)	29.7 (85.5)	29.1 (84.4)	28.7 (83.7)	28.1 (82.6)	28.0 (82.4)	28.2 (82.8)	28.9 (84.0)	29.5 (85.1)	29.9 (85.8)	29.2 (84.6)
Daily mean °C (°F)	26.8 (80.2)	26.9 (80.4)	26.7 (80.1)	26.5 (79.7)	26.1 (79.0)	25.9 (78.6)	25.4 (77.7)	25.2 (77.4)	25.4 (77.7)	25.9 (78.6)	26.3 (79.3)	26.6 (79.9)	26.1 (79.1)
Mean daily minimum °C (°F)	23.5 (74.3)	23.6 (74.5)	23.5 (74.3)	23.4 (74.1)	23.2 (73.8)	23.1 (73.6)	22.7 (72.9)	22.4 (72.3)	22.7 (72.9)	22.9 (73.2)	23.2 (73.8)	23.4 (74.1)	23.1 (73.6)
Average precipitation mm (inches)	390 (15.4)	387 (15.2)	453 (17.8)	395 (15.6)	385 (15.2)	321 (12.6)	269 (10.6)	270 (10.6)	322 (12.7)	351 (13.8)	301 (11.9)	345 (13.6)	4,189 (165)
Source: Climate-Data.org

== Name ==
The island is locally called Linue [ˈlinʉə] in Lo-Toga. The official name Linua [linua] is spelled according to the Mota language, which missionaries chose as a reference in the area; the latter form is conservative of the ancient form *linua which can be reconstructed in the ancestral language of the Torres and Banks Islands.
