= Tinak Airport =

- IATA: TIC; ICAO: none; FAA LID: N18

Summary
- Serves: Tinak, Arno Atoll, Marshall Islands
- Elevation AMSL: 4 ft (1.2 m)
- Coordinates: 07°08′N 171°55′E
- Interactive map of Tinak Airport

Runways
Direction	Length		Surface
Direction	ft	m	Surface
05/23	2,850	869	Coral Gravel
- Source: Federal Aviation Administration

Tinak Airport, (IATA: TIC, FAA LID: N18), is a public use airstrip located in the village of Tinak on Arno Atoll, Marshall Islands.

== Facilities ==
Tinak Airport is at an elevation of 4 feet (1.2 m) above mean sea level. The runway is designated 05/23 with a coral gravel surface measuring 2,850 by 45 feet (869 x 14 m). There are no aircraft based at Tinak.
