= Torres Islands =

Island chain in Torba Province, Vanuatu

Coordinates: 13°15′S 166°37′E

The Torres Islands.

The Torres Islands are an island chain in the Torba Province of the country of Vanuatu, the country’s northernmost island group. The chain of islands that make up this micro-archipelago straddles the broader cultural boundary between Island Melanesia and several Polynesian outliers located in the neighbouring Solomon Islands. To the island chain’s north is Temotu Province of the Solomon Islands, to its south is Espiritu Santo, and to its southeast are the Banks Islands. To the west, beneath the ocean surface, is the deep Torres Trench, which is the subduction zone between the Australian Plate and Pacific Plate.

The seven islands in the Torres group, from north to south, are Hiw or Hiu (the largest), Metoma, Tegua, Ngwel (an uninhabited islet), Linua, Lo or Loh, and Toga. The island chain stretches across 42 kilometres (26 miles). The highest point of the chain is only 200 metres (656 feet) above sea level. These islands are less rugged than the other islands of Vanuatu that lie further to the south. Contrary to popular belief, only a few stretches of the Torres Islands' coastlines are graced with white sand beaches; in reality, their shores are mostly made of rocky coral uplift.

As of 2020, the Torres Islands had a total population of approximately 1128 people. They are dispersed across at least ten settlements of various sizes, all located on or near coastal areas. The names of these settlements are: Yögevigemëne (or Yögemëne for short), Tinemēvönyö, Yawe and Yakwane (on Hiw), Lotew (on Tegua; sometimes misspelled Lateu), Lungharegi, Telakwlakw and Rinuhe (on Lo), and Likwal and Litew (on Toga). A small airstrip on Linua, opened in 1983, provides the only regular transportation link between the Torres Islands and the rest of Vanuatu. Lungharegi is the administrative centre for the Torres Islands, but its governance role is minimal. It has a community phone and medical clinic, but no bank or police station, and only two sparsely stocked stores. Carlos Mondragón, a researcher whose work largely focuses on Vanuatu, notes:

The Torres lie in a scarcely populated maritime region that is distant from Vanuatu's main centres of government, transport and commerce, and suffer from very poor delivery of basic services - health, education and transport.

== Name ==
The name “Torres” was bestowed on the islands by European cartographers, in remembrance of the sixteenth-century navigator Luis Vaz de Torres, who had briefly visited the islands of North and Central Vanuatu in April, May and June 1606, as part of a Spanish expedition across the Pacific, from South America to Terra Australis. The navigator's name was also bestowed on the important Torres Strait, which separates mainland Australia from the island of New Guinea. Ironically, Torres never saw, or even heard about, the Torres Islands. However, his commander, the Portuguese captain Fernandes de Queirós, serving the Spanish Crown, did sail near the Torres Islands at one point in search of the Santa Cruz Islands.

Long before Europeans arrived, the indigenous inhabitants and neighbors of these islands had called them by various other names, the most important of which, in Proto-Torres-Banks, was *Vava [ˈβaβa] (> Lo-Toga Vave [ˈβaβə], Mwotlap (with locative prefix a-) Avap [aˈβap]). However, after the name “Torres” began appearing on maps, that name eventually stuck, and the islands have now been widely known by that name for almost two hundred years. Today, even the inhabitants of the islands use that name, and only the oldest among them recall the Lo-Toga name Vave. They now designate their group of islands as ‘Torres’, and in general are indifferent to (or unaware of) the origin story of the name.

== History ==
Stuart Bedford, writing in the journal Terra Australis in 2006, noted that “the archaeology of Northern Vanuatu remains somewhat of an archaeological terra incognita”. The archealogical work of Galipaud in 1998 was mainly focused on only two of the Torres Islands, Tegua and Toga. Ceramic artefacts were found to be fairly frequent at surface level, with excavations being carried out using test-pit methods across both open and cave sites. Surface-collected materials included shell adzes, arm rings, volcanic glass and worn pottery. Galipaud believed some of the pottery to be Mangaasi style, a style named after an important archeological site on the west coast of Efate in Central Vanuatu, though other shards appeared to be examples of later plainware, a less decorated style found across the Polynesian region. Charcoal recovered from test-pits on Toga were tested using both AMS and C-14 radiocarbon-dating, dating the material between 2739-2333 BP (i.e. 789–383 BCE), and giving an estimate of the earliest settlement of the region. This can be compared with the larger northern island of Malekula, where dating of shell and charcoal samples was similarly placed at around 2700 BP. Bedford notes that this date is slightly later than the suggested arrival of Lapita culture elsewhere in the country, which is dated to roughly 3000-2900 BP. Whilst evidence of Lapita culture has been established in nearly all parts of the country, Shing and Willie note that the Torres Islands are the only inhabited region that does not show Lapita settlement.

There is abundant archaeological and oral-history evidence that, before European contact, the pattern of settlements in the Torres Islands was quite different from pattern prevalent in the coastal villages of today. Back then, most villages and extended family areas (called nakamals, locally gemël) were located on higher ground, away from the shore, and were inhabited by fewer people. Thus, the islands were probably dotted with small clearings, in the middle of which were a handful of households and public spaces.

Although several European explorers reached the islands in the 19th century, in the early 1880s the islanders were quickly drawn into the sphere of influence of the Melanesian Mission. The establishment of coastal settlements, both for church work and for trade, had the effect of attracting the inhabitants to leave their inland hamlets, and concentrate in these coastal villages.

Around this time, a Torres islander, known today by his Christianised name of Adams Tuwia, was transferred to the Mission's headquarters on Norfolk Island, where he eventually became ordained a priest. However, the first Melanesian ever to be ordained as a Christian priest was George Sarawia, from the neighbouring Banks Islands. Because the Anglicans had set up their regional centre of operations in the Banks Islands, the mission's leadership decided to adopt the language of Mota in the Banks as the language of choice for translating and transmitting Christian teachings across the whole region comprising the Banks, Torres and Temotu island groups. As a result, according to local accounts, the Mota language continued to be taught in the Torres mission school until the early 1970s, and it is still possible to find elder Torres Islanders who can speak and understand Mota.

Notwithstanding the existence of a mission in the Torres Islands in the late nineteenth century, a non-local missionary only came to reside in those islands for an extended period in the first decade of the 20th century. This was the Rev. Walter John Durrad, who lived on Tegua and then moved to Lo between 1905 and 1910.

The first permanent mission station and church-house of the Torres Islands was originally established by Durrad on the south coast of Tegua, but was eventually moved to Vipaka, on the southwest side of Lo, following an apparent rumour of incestuous behaviour by the high chief of Tegua, whose sin was judged to be too abhorrent for the sensitivity of the Mission's leadership. More importantly, during this time - between the second half of the nineteenth century and the first half of the twentieth - the population of the Torres Islands suffered catastrophic decline as a combined result of the various epidemic diseases that were introduced by Europeans and the accelerated out-migration provoked by Blackbirding. According to vaguely worded Mission records located at the Diocese of Banks and Torres headquarters on Sola (Vanua Lava), at some time in the early 1930s the total population of the Torres group numbered no more than 56 persons. Hence, the subsequent recovery of the indigenous population of these islands, along with the continuity of linguistic and cultural values that they still exhibit, can be described as nothing less than remarkable.

According to some researchers, the Torres islands belonged to a broader regional complex of human and material exchanges that extended well into present-day Temotu province in the Solomons. These networks are however not reflected by any facts of linguistic convergence: the Torres languages exclusively show connections with the Banks languages further south. In 1906, the Torres Islands eventually became part of the Anglo-French Condominium of the New Hebrides in 1906; they were subsequently incorporated into the Republic of Vanuatu in 1980.

== Ecology ==
Like the rest of the country, the Torres islands are in the Vanuatu rain forests ecoregion. The coconut crab (Birgus latro) is one of the islands' most famous species. On the island of Loh, However, since the opening of the airstrip at Linua these animals became the single most important cash crop in the Torres group. To date, the sale of Birgus has been directly governed by the fluctuating demand of the tourist market in faraway Port Vila and, to a lesser degree, the provincial township of Luganville. As early as 1991, scientists acknowledged a 'rapid decline occurring in many of these [coconut crab] populations'.

Consequently, various concerned individuals and groups successfully pressured the local provincial government of SanMa (the province in which Luganville is located) to declare a temporary ban on the sale, purchase or consumption of crab in that province. This ban first took effect in the first semestre of 2004. Exports of crab from the Banks and Torres Islands (i.e. TorBa Province) to Port Vila is regulated through a relatively inefficient scheme of "open" and "closed" seasons and intra-regional quotas. In 1994, a catch quota for B. latro in the Torres region was set at 6000 crabs per year, with the closed season running from September to November. As of 2020, this number was set to 5000, with only two license holders permitted to buy them; this caused frustrations amongst local communities in Torba Province who rely on the crab as their main source of income. Journalist Patience Mawa shared the feelings of Kimstone William, the Community Liaison Officer in Torres:

He says there are other agricultural sources of income but these industries need to be built up with more assistance from agriculture officers so that new agricultural methods can be introduced to improve farming productivity on Torres.

As of September 2026, the penalty for catching B. latro in Torba Province during the two-month closed period is a fine of up to VT1million.

Another potential threat to B. latro is the invasive species W. auropunctata, which has reduced arthropod diversity elsewhere.

Alongside B. latro, Mondragón suggests that there are six 'culturally salient' animal species in the Torres region, providing their local names. These include the nikwerot (P. fundatus), B. latro, and spiders, 'whose attributes... are associated with the entity known as Merawehih (Meravtit, in the language of Hiu [sic]), the greatest culture hero in the Torres group.'

During his research on the terrestrial herpetofauna of the Torres and Banks Islands, researcher Ivan Ineich identifies the presence of about 300 reptile species. A number of species on the Torres Islands are those present elsewhere in Vanuatu, including G. oceanica, C. novohebridicus (which is endemic to the country), L. noctua and C. bibroni. Introduced species include G. mutilata and R. braminus. There are some species present that are also found in the southern Solomon Islands to the north of the Torres region, namely L. guppyi and L. lugubris. G. vittatus has also extended its range via the Solomon Islands to the Torres Islands of Toga, Lo, Tegua and Hiu; Ineich currently points to this being a Northern Vanuatuan lizard that is not present on Espiritu Santo, which lies about 100km from the southernmost island of the Torres group (Toga). Summarising the distribution of herpetofauna in the Torres/Banks region, Ineich says:

more northern elements (= from the southern Solomons, present on the Santa Cruz Group) than Vanuatu elements are lacking from the Banks/Torres Groups, thus revealing the clear Vanuatuan affinities of these islands... one can not exclude that such absences may also be related to particular hydrographic and geologic conditions present on these calcareous, relatively dry and low elevation islands, despite their high annual rainfall.

== Geography ==
=== Geology ===
The Torres Islands are geologically the oldest part of Vanuatu. Robin et al. note that they are part of the Western Belt, which features a crustal wedge of rocks up to 26km thick on the western side of the central arc platform complex, the underlying physiogeographic feature of the whole country that splits into three chains. The oldest rocks belong to the Torres volcanics, with the earliest volcanism appearing on the two northernmost islands. Initially, deposition from this early volcanism was largely underwater. Towards the top of the geologic succession, however, subaerial flow units - a layer of volcanic material that is deposited on land rather than underwater - point to the eventual emergence of the islands. K/ar dating from the northernmost islands suggest the Torres volcanics occurred 39 Ma and 37 Ma, or between the late Eocene/early Oligocene epochs, although other dating of foraminifers from limestone clasts in the region indicate a much younger age of 20-25 Ma (late Oligocene/early Miocene). Major uplift and erosion occurred in the early late Miocene era (11-8 Ma), during which time the Torres islands emerged. However, during the early Pliocene era, the Western Belt was totally submerged following tectonic subsidence in the middle late Miocene era (8-7 Ma). Eventually, vertical uplift of the Western Belt in the late Pliocene to Holocene period (2-0 Ma), impacted by the subduction of the d’Entrecasteaux Zone, led to the elevated Quaternary limestone formations seen today. Jouannic et al. point to C-14 radiocarbon dating and uranium-thorium dating for the ages of Torres island fossil corals, which indicate that for roughly the past 100,000 years the islands have uplifted at a constant rate, between 0.7 to 0.9mm per year.

=== Rising sea levels ===
Since the late 1990s, rising sea levels in the Torres Islands have caused concern both locally and internationally. Between 2002 and 2004, one village was displaced by the advancing sea. In 2005, a statement from the United Nations Environment Programme classified this as the first case of climate refugees. Mondragón warns, however, that simplistic views of small island societies affect how we understand the role of Torres Islanders in the context of climate change, and lead to narrow interventions from outside:

These stereotypes diminish local actors and their capacities, and can lead to single-issue interventions, such as the current focus on sea-level rise, to the detriment of broader chains of human-environmental complexity.

Sea level rise has been exacerbated by seismic activity in the region. In April 1997, a 7.8 magnitude earthquake caused the islands to sink between 50 and 100 centimetres, rapidly raising the relative sea level and contributing to the flooding that occurred in subsequent years. In addition, measurements show that the islands continued to sink gradually between 1997 and 2009, exacerbating the effects of natural sea-level rise.

In October 2009, a series of three earthquakes (magnitude 7.6, 7.8 and 7.4) raised the islands by around 20 centimetres, temporarily returning the sea level to its 1998 level. These events demonstrate that, in addition to global climate change, geological processes in the region have a significant impact on sea level variations.

=== Extreme rainfall ===
Mondragón points out that a greater risk factor for the Torres region than sea-level change is the increase in sudden extreme rainfall that does not follow previously understood seasonal patterns. He notes that Torres islanders began to take note of this phenomenon in 2006, before unseasonal rainfall became a common part of climate change discourse:

It was only after 2007 that extreme and damaging rainfall began to appear in the printed and oral dissemination of climate awareness programmes reaching the Torres Islands. This would suggest an exceptional example of local perceptions preceding exogenous information about climate change.

The prevalence of more extreme rainfall is thought to be caused by climate change-associated alterations to the movements of the South Pacific Convergence Zone (SPCZ), a persistent rain band that has been observed to be more frequently displaced into more northerly Pacific regions. Moreover, the more western and northerly area of the band is largely affected by sea surface temperature (SST); this area is therefore affected by the observed warming of equatorial Pacific waters.

== Languages ==
Two closely related yet distinct languages are spoken in the Torres group: Hiw and Lo-Toga. Hiw is spoken by the population (about 280 people) of the sole island of Hiw. Lo-Toga is spoken on the southern parts of the Torres, on the islands of Lo, Toga, and Tegua (about 580 people); it consists of two very close dialect varieties, Lo and Toga. Toga is sometimes used as a cover term for the two dialects. There is no mutual intelligibility between Hiw and Lo-Toga, but many Hiw speakers are bilingual.

Hiw and Lo-Toga are North Vanuatu languages, a subgroup of the Oceanic family. As is the case for most unwritten languages of Vanuatu, no detailed description has ever been published yet on them. In 2004, the linguist Alexandre François undertook the first descriptive study of these two languages, which is currently in progress.

== Culture ==
The islanders divide themselves ethnically into essentially two groups, matching their linguistic division. The cultural differences existing within the Torres Is., at least in the perception of the islanders, essentially match language boundaries: that is, two groups are recognised — the 'people of Hiw' vs the 'people of Toga'; however, a secondary, less essential division is drawn between the two populations of Lo and Toga. The islanders were first described in very general - and not always accurate - ethnographic terms by W. J. Durrad at the beginning of the twentieth century (fragments of Durrad's notes were eventually published in the 1940s), and have been the bailiwick of the anthropologist Carlos Mondragón since 1999.

Today the inhabitants of the Torres Islands continue to follow to the same general patterns of subsistence agriculture and supplementary fishing activities that their ancestors did. In addition, key aspects of their ancestral knowledge and ritual cycles are still generally extant. These are dominated by two male-centred institutions, known as the hukwe (which is the equivalent of the suqe in the Banks Islands) and the lēh-temēt. The hukwe constitutes the local complex of status-alteration rituals by which men are able to acquire greater status and power, while the lēh-temēt is the name given to a smaller group of men who have been initiated into specific types of ritual knowledge that are directly relevant to the manipulation of mana (generative potency or power) and, more specifically, to the relationship between the living and the dead. The most impressive and visible aspect of the activities of the initiates of the lēh-temēt are the manufacture and use of ritual headdresses known as temēt (primordial spirits) during special singing and dancing ceremonial rituals. In fact, the headdresses are known as temēt because they are considered to BE the temporary physical manifestations of temēt; hence, the use of headdresses is considered to be an extremely delicate operation, during which the possibility of spiritual pollution has to be closely monitored and controlled. It is partly for this reason that the headdresses are always destroyed immediately at the end of the ceremony. Notwithstanding the continuity of certain core customary practices, many important and profound changes have transformed the lives and worldviews of these people as a result of more than a century of contacts and interpenetration by the Anglican church, colonial administrators and traders, and, most recently, the postcolonial influence of the nation-state and the international world market - whose greatest direct manifestation is in the form of cash, independent travellers, sailing ships and luxury cruise liners which visit this island group every so often.
