= Teixeira de Freitas Airport =

9 de maio Airport Aeroporto 9 de maio
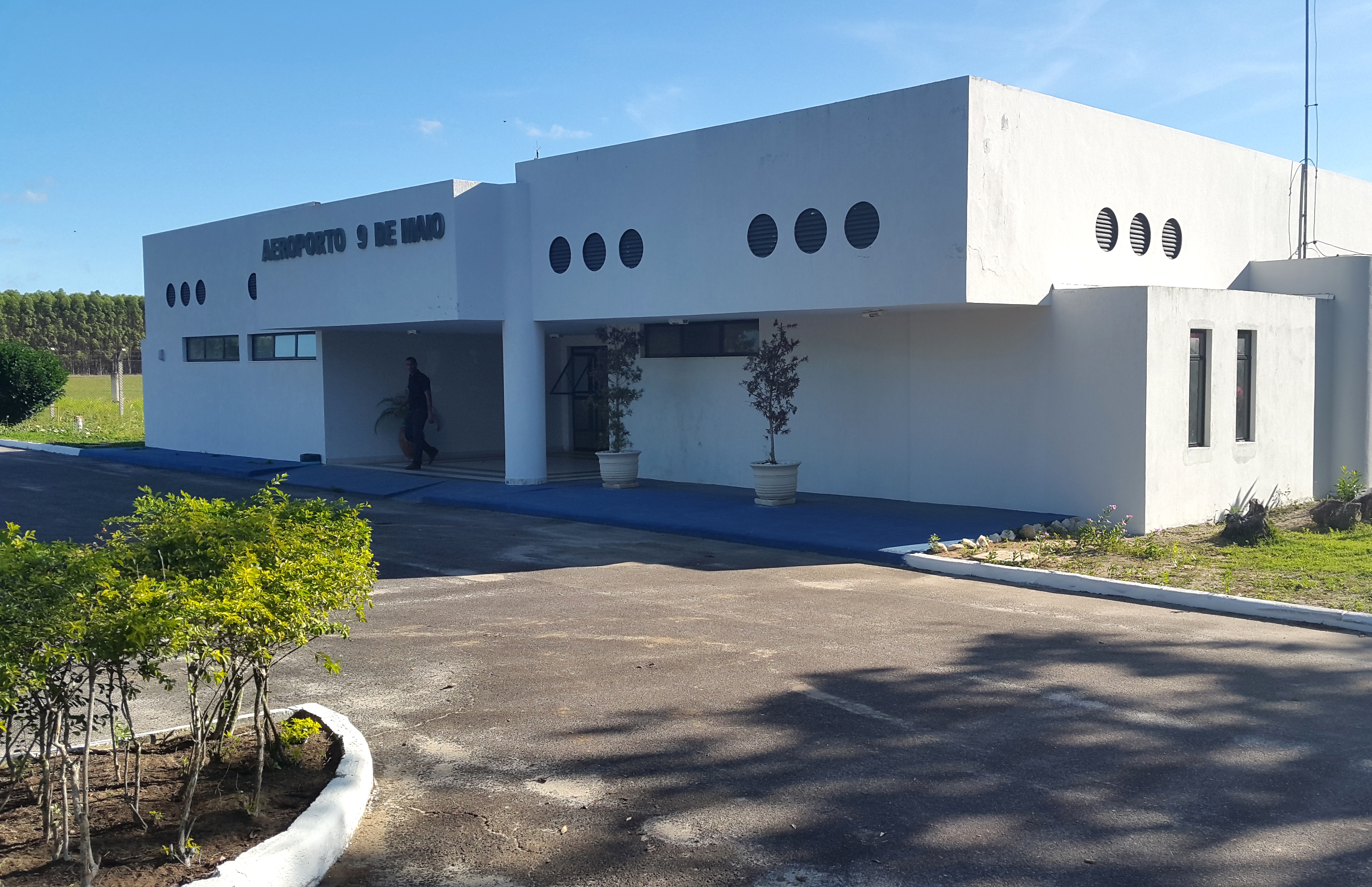
- IATA: TXF; ICAO: SNTF; LID: BA0016

Summary
- Airport type: Public
- Operator: São Francisco (?–2025); Seinfra (2025–present)
- Serves: Teixeira de Freitas
- Time zone: BRT (UTC−03:00)
- Elevation AMSL: 105 m (344 ft)
- Coordinates: 17°31′28″S 039°40′06″W

Map
- Location in Brazil

Runways
Direction	Length		Surface
Direction	m	ft	Surface
11/29	1,460	4,790	Asphalt
- Sources: ANAC, DECEA

9 de maio Airport (IATA: TXF, ICAO: SNTF) is the airport serving Teixeira de Freitas, Brazil.

== History ==
Teixeira de Freitas—9 de Maio Airport is a regional airport, located in Teixeira de Freitas, south of the state of Bahia, Brazil. The airport serves locations in south Bahia, northeast of Minas Gerais and north of Espírito Santo.

Previously operated by Concessionária São Francisco Administração Aeroportuário e Rodoviário, since August 16, 2025 it is administrated by the State of Bahia through its Infrastructure Secretariat Seinfra.

== Airlines and destinations ==
Airlines	Destinations
Gol Linhas Aéreas	Salvador–Deputado Luís Eduardo Magalhães International Airport

Until early 2022, Azul Brazilian Airlines operated flights from Teixeira de Freitas to Belo Horizonte International Airport

== Access ==
The airport is located 8 km (5 mi) from downtown Teixeira de Freitas.

== See also ==
- List of airports in Brazil
