= Lo (island) =

Island in Vanuatu

Coordinates: 13°20′24″S 166°37′48″E

Native name: Lō
- Location of Lo in the Torres Islands of Vanuatu

Geography
- Location: Pacific Ocean
- Archipelago: Vanuatu, Torres Islands
- Area: 11.9 km^{2} (4.6 sq mi)
- Highest elevation: 155 m (509 ft)

Administration
- Vanuatu
- Province: Torba Province

Demographics
- Population: 210 (2009)

Lo [lo] (sometimes wrongly spelled Loh) is an island in the Torres group of islands, in northern Vanuatu. The island is located 2.25 miles from the Toga Island. As of 2009, the population of the island was 210. They speak the Lo dialect of the Lo-Toga language.

== Name ==
The name Lo comes from the Lo-Toga language, where it is spelt Lō [lo]. It is of obscure origin.

== Transportation ==
The Torres islands are served by Torres Airport, which is located on the Linua island, just off the north coast of Lo. The airport is mostly used by Lo residents. Lo is not frequently visited by outsiders.

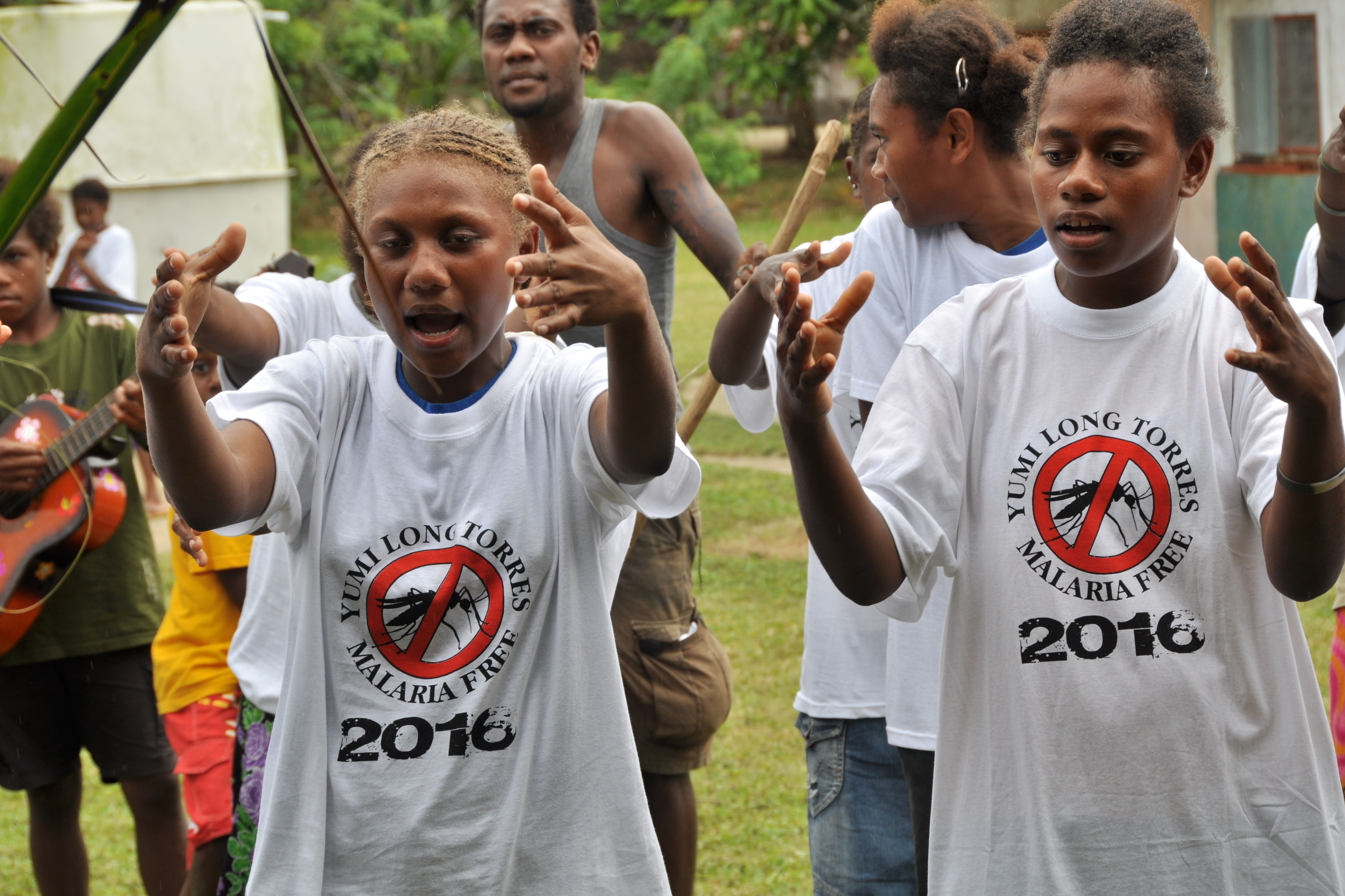
Launch of a program to eliminate malaria, Loh Island, September 2012.

== Villages ==
Lo has two main villages: Lun̄haregi [lʉŋˈharəɣi] (a.k.a. Lunghariki) and Rinuhe [riˈnʉhə]; and a smaller hamlet, Telaqlaq [təlakʷˈlakʷ]. In 2018, the Vanuatu Coastal Adaptation Project provided the villages with access to fresh water.
