= Torba Province =

Province of Vanuatu

Coordinates: 13°45′S 167°30′E

Torba
- Province
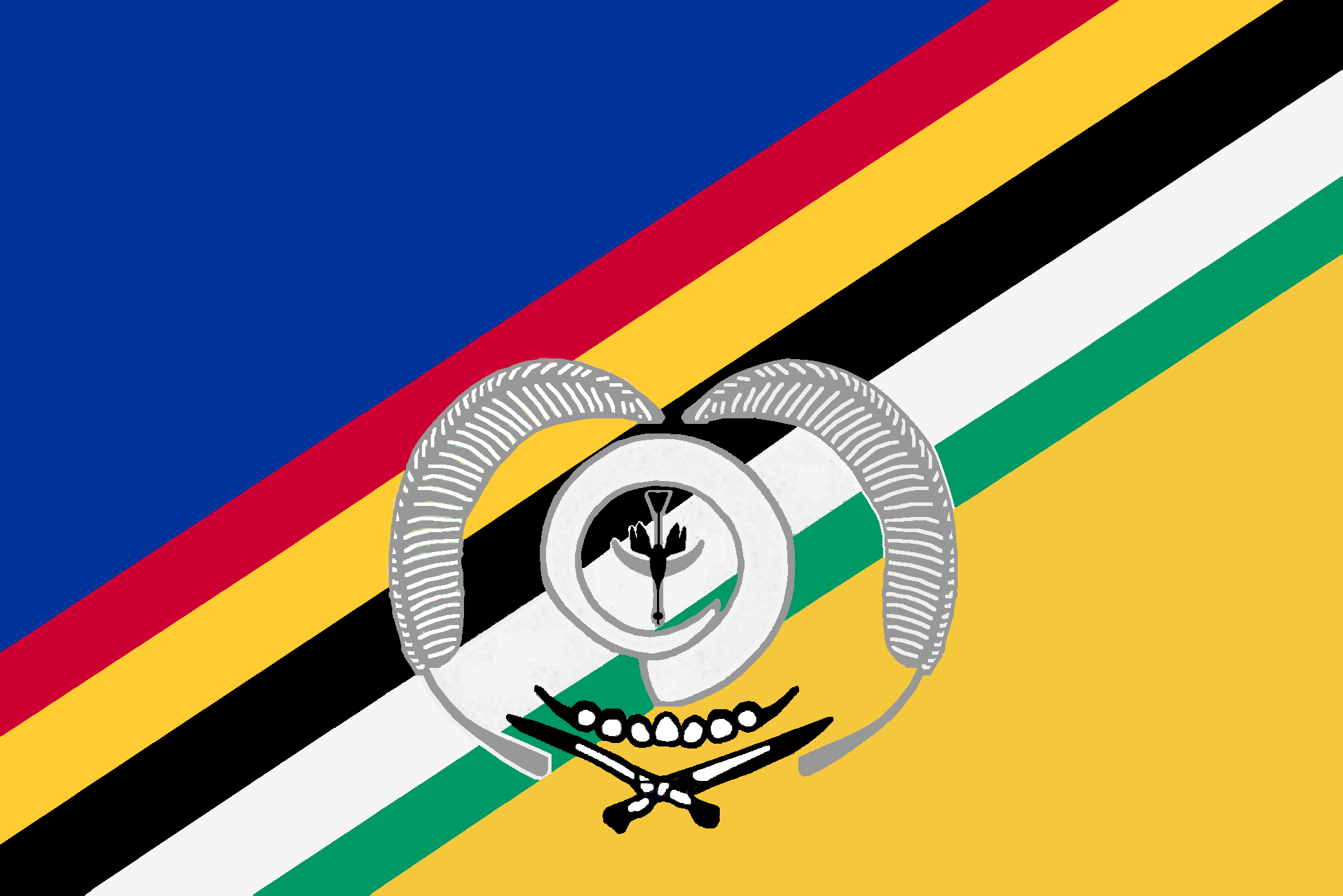
- Flag

- Torba in Vanuatu
- Country: Vanuatu
- Capital: Sola

Area
  - Total: 882 km^{2} (341 sq mi)

Population (2020)
  - Total: 11,002
  - Density: 12.5/km^{2} (32.3/sq mi)

Torba (or TorBa) is the northernmost and least populous province of Vanuatu.

It consists of the Banks Islands and the Torres Islands. It has an area of 882 square kilometres (341 square miles). Its capital is Sola on Vanua Lava.

The province's name is derived from the initial letters of TORres and BAnks.

== Administrative divisions ==
Torba Province are subdivided into nine area councils, which are further subdivided into populated places (i.e. villages, communities, etc.). These area councils are, in geographical order (from NW to SE):

- Torres Area Council
- Ureparapara Area Council
- Motalava Area Council
- East Vanualava Area Council
- West Vanualava Area Council
- Mota Area Council
- East Gaua Area Council
- West Gaua Area Council
- Merelava-Merig Area Council

== Islands ==
These are the main islands of Torba Province, excluding smaller and uninhabited islets.

Banks Islands

Name	Population	Area in km^{2}
Gaua	2,491	342
Kwakéa	26	1.2
Merelava	647	18
Merig	12	0.5
Mota	683	9.5
Motalava	1,451	24
Ra	189	0.5
Ureparapara	437	39
Vanua Lava	2,597	314

Torres Islands

Name	Population	Area in km^{2}
Hiw	269	51
Linua	0	2.5
Lo	210	11.9
Metoma	13	3
Tegua	58	30.8
Toga	276	18.8

== Population ==
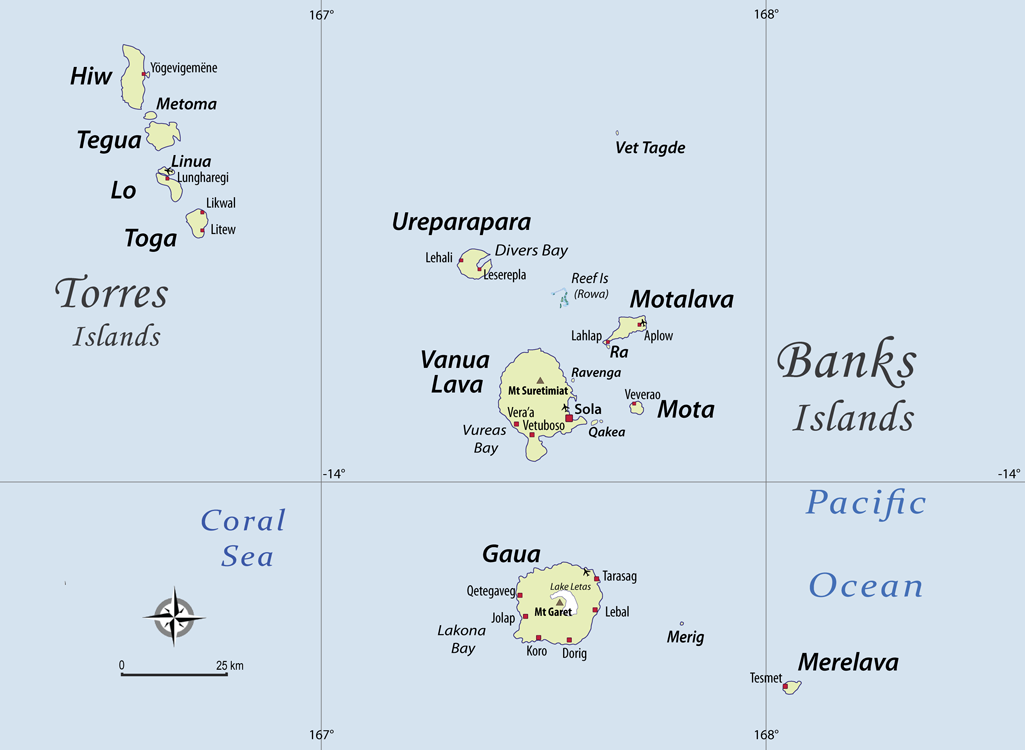
Detailed map of Torba province (Torres-Banks)

The province had a population of 9,359 in 2009, 10,161 in 2016, and 11,002 in 2020.

== Languages ==
The Torba province has seventeen languages, which are all Oceanic. From north to south, they are: Hiw, Lo-Toga, Lehali, Löyöp, Volow, Mwotlap, Lemerig, Vera'a, Vurës, Mwesen, Mota, Nume, Dorig, Koro, Olrat, Lakon, and Mwerlap. With an average of 550 speakers per language, Torba is one of the most linguistically dense areas of Vanuatu, which is itself the country with the highest density of languages per capita in the world.

== Bibliography ==
- François, Alexandre (2012), "The dynamics of linguistic diversity: Egalitarian multilingualism and power imbalance among northern Vanuatu languages" (PDF), International Journal of the Sociology of Language, 2012 (214): 85–110, doi:10.1515/ijsl-2012-0022, S2CID 145208588
- François, Alexandre; Franjieh, Michael; Lacrampe, Sébastien; Schnell, Stefan (2015), "The exceptional linguistic density of Vanuatu", in François, Alexandre; Lacrampe, Sébastien; Franjieh, Michael; Schnell, Stefan (eds.), The Languages of Vanuatu: Unity and Diversity, Studies in the Languages of Island Melanesia, Canberra: Asia Pacific Linguistics Open Access, pp. 1–21, hdl:1885/14819, ISBN 9781922185235.
