= Twin Hills Airport =

Airport in Alaska, United States

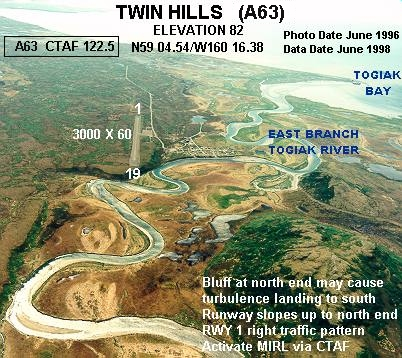
- IATA: TWA; ICAO: none; FAA LID: A63

Summary
- Airport type: Public
- Owner: State of Alaska DOT&PF - Central Region
- Serves: Twin Hills, Alaska
- Elevation AMSL: 82 ft (25 m)
- Coordinates: 59°04′28″N 160°16′30″W

Map
- Location of airport in Alaska

Runways
Direction	Length		Surface
Direction	ft	m	Surface
18/36	3,000	914	Gravel

Statistics (2009)
- Aircraft operations: 1,900
- Enplanements (2008): 395
- Source: Federal Aviation Administration

Twin Hills Airport (IATA: TWA, FAA LID: A63) is a state-owned, public-use airport serving Twin Hills, in the Dillingham Census Area of the U.S. state of Alaska. Scheduled airline service to Dillingham Airport is provided by Peninsula Airways (PenAir).

As per Federal Aviation Administration records, this airport had 395 commercial passenger boardings (enplanements) in calendar year 2008, a decrease of 23% from the 510 enplanements in 2007. Twin Hills Airport is included in the FAA's National Plan of Integrated Airport Systems (2009–2013), which categorizes it as a general aviation facility.

Although most U.S. airports use the same three-letter location identifier for the FAA and IATA, this airport is assigned A63 by the FAA and TWA by the IATA.

== Facilities and aircraft ==
Twin Hills Airport has one runway designated 18/36 with a gravel surface measuring 3,000 by 60 feet (914 x 18 m). For the 12-month period ending February 28, 2009, the airport had 1,900 aircraft operations, an average of 158 per month: 87% air taxi and 13% general aviation.

== Airlines and destinations ==
Airlines	Destinations
Grant Aviation	Dillingham, Manokotak, Togiak

== See also ==
- List of airports in Alaska
