= Tapini Rural LLG =

Local-level government in Papua New Guinea

- Location within Papua New Guinea
- Coordinates: 8.312°S 147.018°E
- Country: Papua New Guinea
- Province: Central Province
- District: Goilala District
- Capital: Tapini

Government
  - President: Sebastine Mark

Area
  - Total: 1,501 km^{2} (580 sq mi)

Population (2000)
  - Total: 7,315
  - Density: 4.873/km^{2} (12.62/sq mi)

Languages
  - Main languages: Tauade
- Time zone: UTC+10 (AEST)

The Tapini Rural LLG is a local-level government area situated in the Goilala District of the Central Province of Papua New Guinea. In 2000, the LLG had 1,685 households, and a population of 7,315 (3,793 men and 3,522 women). The LLG has a President and a Deputy President, and elections are normally held every five years after the national elections in September.

== Wards ==
The area contains the town of Tapini, and is divided into ten wards:

- 53020580 Tapini Urban
- 53020501 Ivani
- 53020502 Central Ivane
- 53020503 Sopu
- 53020504 Kerau
- 53020505 Kataipa
- 53020506 Jowa
- 53020507 Loloipa
- 53020508 Pilitu 1
- 53020509 Pilitu 2

== Villages ==
- Tapini
- Ariomu
- Ilai
- Kataipi
- Kerau
- Kileipi
- Kilete
- Kovetapa
- Lavavai
- Loleava
- Lotuava
- Minalu
- Omoritu
- Opore
- Sopu
- Tatupiti
- Tawuni
- Tororo
- Wapote
- Zania
