= Tarcoola Airport =

Airport near Coober Pedy, Australia

- IATA: TAQ; ICAO: YTAR

Summary
- Location: Tarcoola, South Australia
- Elevation AMSL: 410 ft / 125 m
- Coordinates: 30°42′12″S 134°35′2″E
- Interactive map of Tarcoola Airport

Runways
Direction	Length		Surface
Direction	ft	m	Surface
09/27	4,166	1,270	Asphalt
03/21	4,265	1,300	Asphalt

Tarcoola Airport (IATA: TAQ, ICAO: YTAR) is a small airport located around 125 km south of Coober Pedy.

== Facilities ==
The airport has 2 runways.

- Runway 1: has a length of 1270 m (4166 ft), is made of asphalt, and has an approximate heading of 09/27.
- Runway 2: is the main runway that has a length of 1300 m (4265 ft), also made of asphalt, and has an approximate heading of 03/21.

== See also ==
- List of airports in South Australia
