= Teixeira de Freitas =

City in Bahia, Brazil

- Municipality
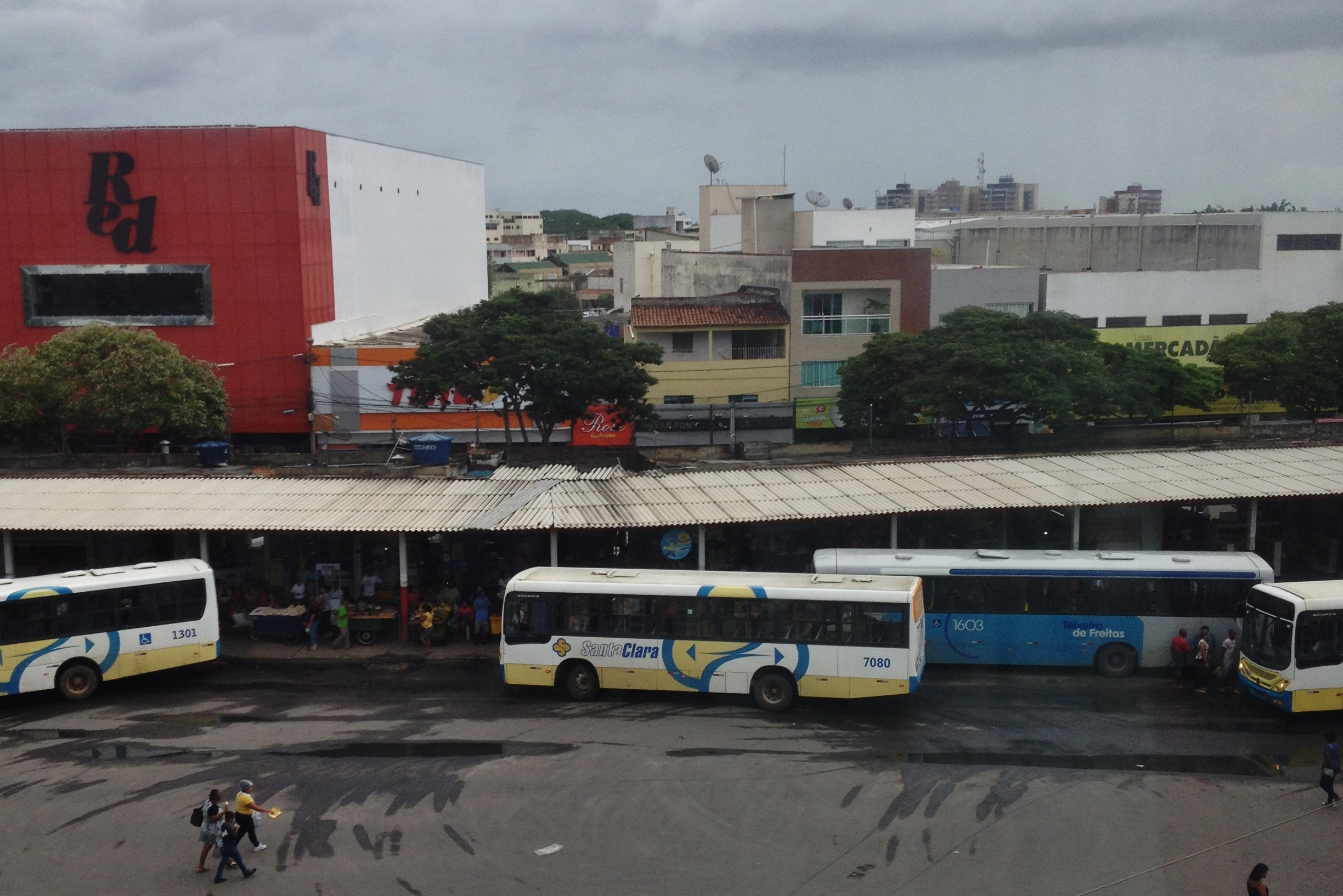

- Flag Coat of arms

- Coordinates: 17.540276°S 39.743730°W
- Country: Brazil
- Region: Northeast
- State: Bahia
- Surrounding region: Ilhéus-Itabuna
- Established: 9 May 1985

Government
  - Mayor: Temoteo Alves de Brito (PSD)

Area
  - Total: 1,165 km^{2} (450 sq mi)
- Elevation: 109 m (358 ft)

Population (2022 Census)
  - Total: 141,385
  - Estimate (2025): 155,307
  - Density: 121.4/km^{2} (314.3/sq mi)
- Time zone: UTC−3 (BRT)
- Website: teixeiradefreitas.ba.gov.br

Teixeira de Freitas is a city in the extreme south of the Brazilian state of Bahia, on the margins of BR-101 highway. It is one of the largest cities in the state, with a population in 2022 Census at 141,385 inhabitants in an area of 1,166 km^{2}.

== History ==
The city had its origin as a crossroads, and has always maintained its character as a place that draws entrepreneurs from other regions. Major expansion of industry in the area, combined with the growth of eucalyptus plantations, has adversely impacted small-scale agriculture in the surrounding rural areas, resulting in declining population in those rural areas. Teixeira de Freitas has also a busy commercial district and the economy has developed a lot lately thanks to the migration of the population from surrounding towns.

== Economy ==
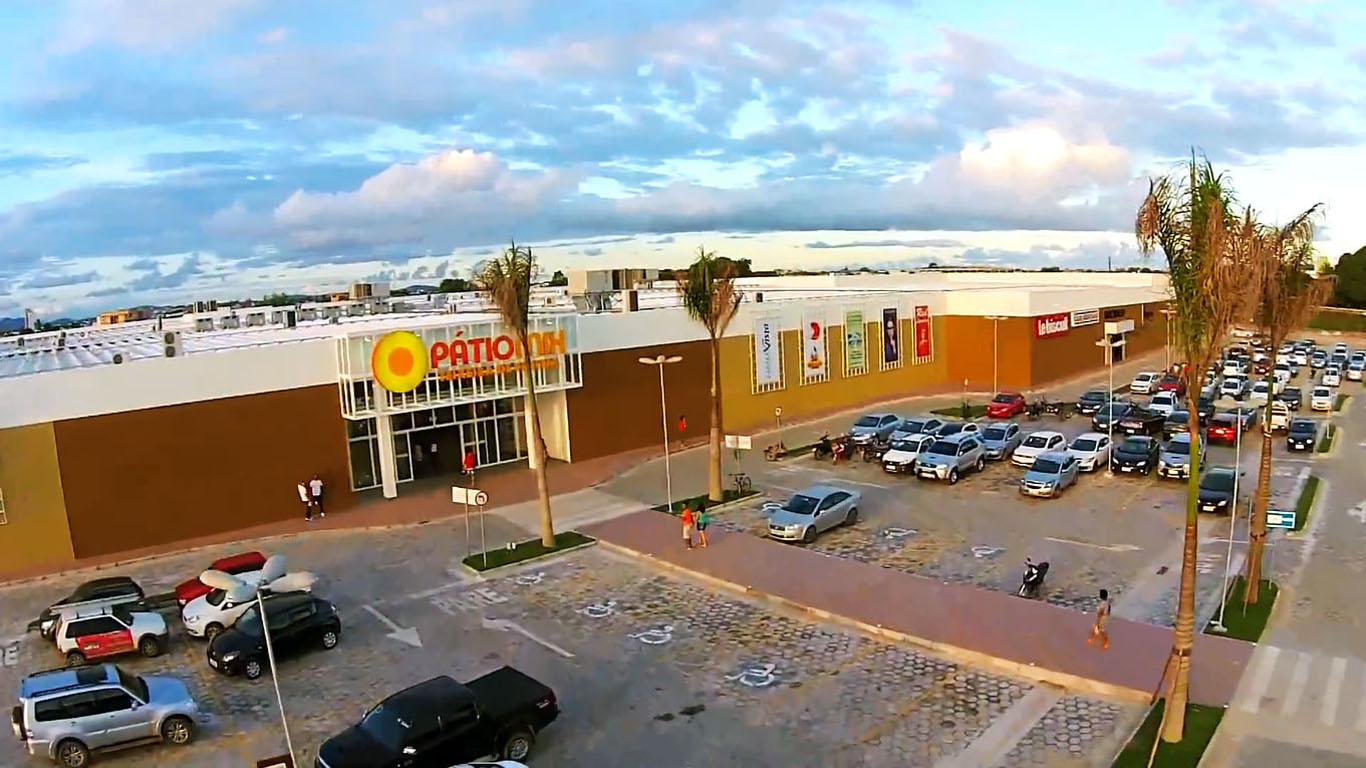
Shopping PátioMix Teixeira de Freitas

It has an agricultural economy, based in cattle ranching and raising crops. There is also a large production of Eucalyptus destined to the extraction of cellulose on factories in the region. The city is a regional commercial center, serving approximately 14 municipalities.

== Geography ==
=== Climate ===
The climate of Teixeira de Freitas is considered tropical (type Am in the climatic classification of Köppen-Geiger), with significant rainfall in most of the months and average annual temperature of 24.3 °C. August is the driest month of the year, with an average of 58 mm of precipitation. November is the month with the highest level of precipitation, with an average of 136 mm. The warmest month of the year is January with an average temperature of 26.2 °C, while June is the coldest, with an average temperature of 22.0 °C. The average annual rainfall is 1099 mm.

Climate data for Helvécia (Note: Helvecia is located approximately 30 kilometres (18.6 mi) south of Texeira de Freitas.), elevation 59 m (194 ft)
Month	Jan	Feb	Mar	Apr	May	Jun	Jul	Aug	Sep	Oct	Nov	Dec	Year
Mean daily maximum °C (°F)	30.3 (86.5)	30.9 (87.6)	30.5 (86.9)	29.0 (84.2)	27.7 (81.9)	26.5 (79.7)	25.7 (78.3)	26.3 (79.3)	27.4 (81.3)	28.4 (83.1)	29.0 (84.2)	29.6 (85.3)	28.4 (83.1)
Daily mean °C (°F)	25.9 (78.6)	26.2 (79.2)	26.2 (79.2)	24.7 (76.5)	23.0 (73.4)	21.9 (71.4)	21.3 (70.3)	21.8 (71.2)	22.9 (73.2)	24.2 (75.6)	24.7 (76.5)	25.4 (77.7)	24.0 (75.2)
Mean daily minimum °C (°F)	21.5 (70.7)	21.5 (70.7)	21.5 (70.7)	20.6 (69.1)	19.0 (66.2)	17.5 (63.5)	16.8 (62.2)	17.0 (62.6)	18.4 (65.1)	19.8 (67.6)	20.7 (69.3)	21.3 (70.3)	19.6 (67.3)
Average precipitation mm (inches)	144.9 (5.70)	110.3 (4.34)	124.5 (4.90)	123.0 (4.84)	117.0 (4.61)	96.1 (3.78)	120.2 (4.73)	72.9 (2.87)	108.8 (4.28)	158.0 (6.22)	164.6 (6.48)	160.5 (6.32)	1,519.8 (59.83)
Source: Universidade Federal de Campina Grande

== Infrastructure ==
=== Education ===
In the year 2015, the municipality contained 50 preschool institutions, 76 primary education institutions and 12 high schools. In total, there are 30,131 enrolled students.

Teixeira de Freitas is a center of regional education, offering technical and higher education courses for the local population and nearby cities. The Federal Institute Baiano (IF Baiano) the campus Paulo Freire of the Federal University of Southern Bahia (UFSB), the campus X Bahia State University (UNEB), two campuses of the Faculty of the South of Bahia (FASB), and a campus of the Pitágoras Faculty (Pitágoras) are all located in the municipality, in addition to other technical and higher education institutions.

== Transportation ==
Teixeira de Freitas had a regional airport, which sees regular flights at least towards the nearby city of Salvador, and since 2026 it has been operated by the local municipal government.

== See also ==
- List of municipalities in Bahia
