= Togiak Airport =

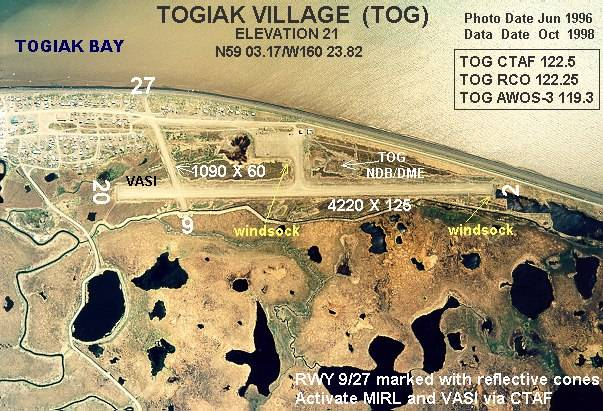
- IATA: TOG; ICAO: PATG; FAA LID: TOG

Summary
- Airport type: Public
- Owner: State of Alaska DOT&PF - Central Region
- Serves: Togiak Village, Alaska
- Elevation AMSL: 21 ft / 6 m
- Coordinates: 59°03′13″N 160°23′49″W

Map
- Location of airport in Alaska

Runways
Direction	Length		Surface
Direction	ft	m	Surface
3/21	4,400	1,341	Gravel
10/28	981	299	Gravel

Statistics (2006)
- Aircraft operations: 10,200
- Enplanements (2008): 1,781
- Source: Federal Aviation Administration

Togiak Airport (IATA: TOG, ICAO: PATG, FAA LID: TOG) is a state-owned, public-use airport located in Togiak Village, in the Bethel Census Area of the U.S. state of Alaska.

As per Federal Aviation Administration records, this airport had 1,781 commercial passenger boardings (enplanements) in calendar year 2008, a decrease of 6% from the 1,886 enplanements in 2007 and 43% from the 3,119 enplanements in 2006. Togiak Airport is included in the FAA's National Plan of Integrated Airport Systems (2009–2013) as commercial service - non-primary, a category for airports with 2,500 to 10,000 enplanements per year.

== Airlines and destinations ==
Airlines	Destinations
Grant Aviation	Dillingham, Manokotak, Twin Hills

== Facilities and aircraft ==
Togiak Airport has two runways with gravel surfaces: 3/21 measures 4,400 by 75 feet (1,341 x 23 m) and 10/28 is 981 by 59 feet (299 x 18 m). The airport is unattended. For the 12-month period ending December 31, 2006, the airport had 10,200 aircraft operations, an average of 27 per day: 78% air taxi and 22% general aviation.

Remarks:

- Runways 10 & 28 non-standard markings; runways edges not marked, thresholds marked with damaged & faded panels.
- Activate MIRL runway 03/21 & VASI runway 21 - CTAF.
- Segmented circle damaged & overgrown with vegetation.
- Runway condition not monitored, recommend visual inspection prior to use.
- When available weather reports hourly only.

== See also ==
- List of airports in Alaska
