= Toga (island) =

Island of Vanuatu

Native name: Toge
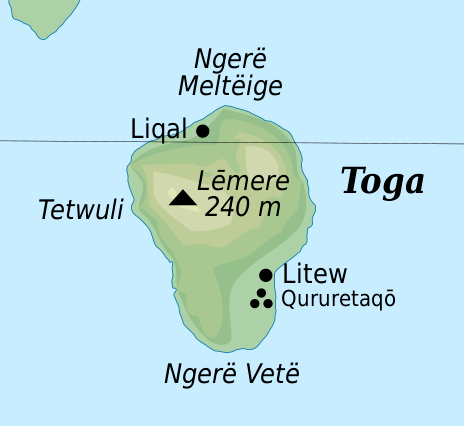
- Map of Toga island

Geography
- Location: Pacific Ocean
- Coordinates: 13°25′S 166°41′E
- Archipelago: Vanuatu, Torres Islands
- Area: 18.8 km^{2} (7.3 sq mi)
- Highest elevation: 104 m (341 ft)
- Highest point: Mt Lemeura

Administration
- Vanuatu
- Province: Torba Province
- Largest settlement: Sola

Demographics
- Population: 250 (2012)

Toga is an island in the Torres group, within the Torba Province of Vanuatu.

== Geography ==
Toga Island is the most southern of the Torres Islands. The island's size is 6 km by 4.5 km. The estimated terrain elevation above sea level is 104 meters. Toga is surrounded by a narrow fringing reef quickly dropping off into deep water. The summit of the island is Mt Lemeura (locally Lēmere [ˈlemərə]) located on the western side of the island. The climate on Toga is humid tropical. The average annual rainfall is about 4000 mm. The island is subject to frequent cyclones and earthquakes.

== Population ==
Toga is the most populated island in the Torres Islands, with about 250 lht. They speak the Toga dialect of the Lo-Toga language. The population lives in two villages: Liqal [liˈkʷal] and Litew [liˈtəw]. An ancient village, now abandoned, was called Qururetaqō [kʷurʉrətakʷo].

== Fauna ==
Barn owls are known to live in the area. Many samples of the owl's bones were found in a cave in Toga, which were reviewed by scientists. Their prey were geckos and rats.

== Name ==
The name Toga [toɣa] comes from the Mota language, which was used as the primary language of the Melanesian Mission. Locally, the island is called Toge [ˈtɔɣə] in Lo-Toga and in Hiw. Both these names come from a Proto-Torres-Banks form *Toɣa.
