= Tekin Airport =

- IATA: TKW; ICAO: AYTN

Summary
- Location: Tekin, Papua New Guinea
- Elevation AMSL: 5,785 ft / 1,763 m
- Coordinates: 5°14′37.2″S 142°9′54.7″E

Map
- Location of airport in Papua New Guinea

Tekin Airport is an airport in Tekin, Papua New Guinea.
