= Panguilemo Airport =

Panguilemo Airport Aeropuerto Panguilemo
- IATA: TLX; ICAO: SCTL

Summary
- Airport type: Public
- Serves: Talca, Chile
- Location: Panguilemo
- Elevation AMSL: 371 ft / 113 m
- Coordinates: 35°22′40″S 71°36′05″W

Map
- Location of Panguilemo Airport in Chile

Runways
Direction	Length		Surface
Direction	m	ft	Surface
03/21	1,125	3,691	Asphalt
- Sources: Landings.com google Maps GCM

Panguilemo Airport (Spanish: Aeropuerto Panguilemo, IATA: TLX, ICAO: SCTL) is an airport 5 kilometres (3.1 mi) northeast of Talca, capital of the Maule Region of Chile.

== See also ==
- Transport in Chile
- List of airports in Chile
