= Barriles Airport =

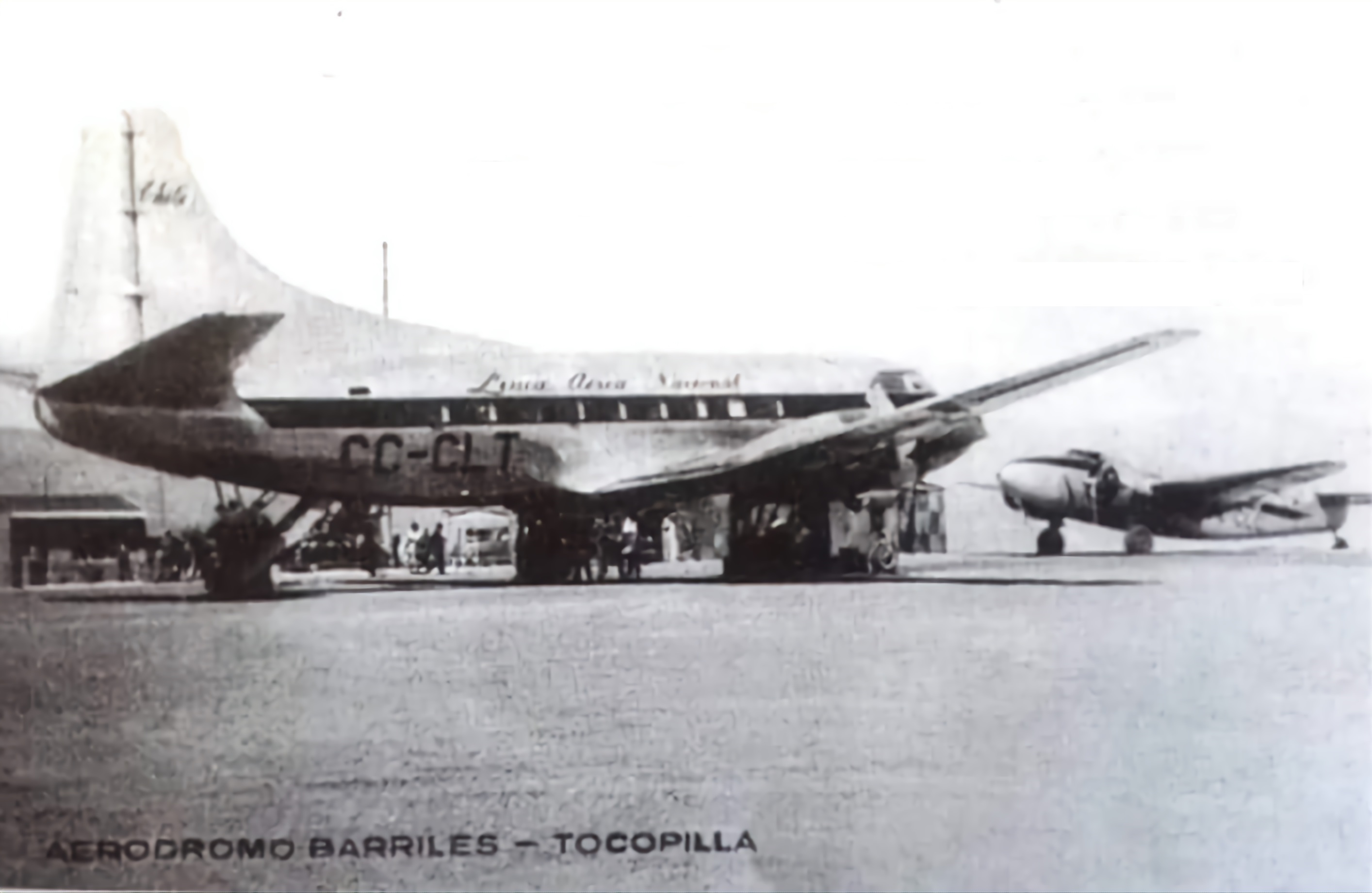
- Barriles airfield
- IATA: TOQ; ICAO: SCBE

Summary
- Airport type: Public
- Serves: Tocopilla, Chile
- Elevation AMSL: 3,475 ft / 1,059 m
- Coordinates: 22°08′25″S 70°03′45″W

Map
- Location of Barriles Airport in Chile

Runways
Direction	Length		Surface
Direction	m	ft	Surface
14/32	1,632	5,354	Asphalt
- Sources: Landings.com Google Maps GCM

Barriles Airport Spanish: Aeropuerto Barriles (IATA: TOQ, ICAO: SCBE) is an airport 15 kilometres (9.3 mi) east-southeast of Tocopilla, a Pacific coastal town in the Antofagasta Region of Chile.

There is distant high terrain northwest through northeast.

== See also ==
- Transport in Chile
- List of airports in Chile
