= Tegua =

Tegua Tugue
- Island
- Location of Tegua in Torres Islands

- Location in Vanuatu
- Coordinates: 13°14′47″S 166°37′33″E
- Country: Vanuatu
- Province: Torba Province

Area
  - Total: 30.8 km^{2} (11.9 sq mi)

Population (2009)
  - Total: 58
  - Density: 1.9/km^{2} (4.9/sq mi)
- Time zone: UTC+11 (VUT)

Tegua is an island in Vanuatu's Torres Islands chain, located in Torba Province.

== Geography ==
The island spans 7 km by 6.5 km; on the eastern side of the island is Lateu Bay indented 1.8 km. Ngwel Island is located 600 meters off the west coast of Tegua Island.

== Population ==
The only village is Lotew (or Lateu), with a population of 58. About 100 residents of Tegua were evacuated by the government because rising sea levels were flooding their island.

One geological study found that of, four islands in the group, Tegua had the slowest inferred uplift rate, at 0.7 mm/yr for southeastern Tegua. A "narrow E-W trending block has been down-dropped relative to the rest of the isle.

== Name ==
The name Tegua [teɣua] comes from the Mota language, which was used as the primary language of the Melanesian Mission. Locally, the island is called Tugue [tʉˈɣʉə] in Lo-Toga, the language spoken on the island, and Töyö [tɵˈjɵ] in neighboring Hiw. These names all come from a Proto-Torres-Banks form *Teɣua.
