= Lo-Toga language =

Austronesian language spoken in Vanuatu

Lo-Toga
- Loh, Toga
- Native to: Vanuatu
- Region: Torres Islands
- Native speakers: 580 (2012)
- Language family: Austronesian: Malayo-Polynesian; Oceanic; Southern Oceanic; North-Central Vanuatu; North Vanuatu; Torres-Banks; Lo-Toga
- Dialects: Lo; Toga

Language codes
- ISO 639-3: lht
- Glottolog: loto1240
- ELP: Lo-Toga

A Lo-Toga speaker, recorded in Vanuatu.

Lo-Toga is an Oceanic language spoken by about 580 people on the islands of Lo and Toga, in the Torres group of northern Vanuatu. The language has sometimes been called Loh [sic] or Toga, after either of its two dialects.

== Name ==
The language is named after the two islands where it is spoken: Lo and Toga.

== Situation and dialects ==
Its 580 speakers live mostly in Lo and Toga, the two main islands in the southern half of the Torres group. The same language is also spoken by the small populations of the two other islands of Linua and Tegua.

Lo-Toga is itself divided into two very close dialects, Lo (spoken on Lo island) and Toga (spoken on Toga). The inhabitants of northern Vanuatu generally don't draw a distinction between dialects and languages.

Conversely, Lo-Toga is a distinct language from the other language of the Torres group, Hiw.

== Phonology ==
The Lo dialect of Lo-Toga phonemically contrasts 16 consonants and 13 vowels.

=== Consonants ===
Lo-Toga consonants
	Bilabial	Alveolar	Retroflex	Dorsal	Labialized velar	Glottal
Nasal	m ⟨m⟩	n ⟨n⟩		ŋ ⟨n̄⟩	ŋʷ ⟨n̄w⟩	
Plosive	p ⟨p⟩	t ⟨t⟩	ʈ͡ʂ ⟨d⟩	k ⟨k⟩	kʷ ⟨q⟩	
Fricative	β ⟨v⟩	s ⟨s⟩		ɣ ⟨g⟩		h ⟨h⟩
Rhotic		r ⟨r⟩				
Lateral		l ⟨l⟩				
Glide					w ⟨w⟩	

=== Vowels ===
The 13 vowel phonemes of the Lo dialect include 8 monophthongs /i e ɛ a ə ɔ o ʉ/, and five diphthongs /i͡e i͡ɛ i͡a o͡ə o͡ɔ/.

Lo-Toga vowels
	Monophthongs			Diphthongs	
	Front	Central	Back	Front	Back
Close	i ⟨i⟩	ʉ ⟨u⟩			
Close-mid	e ⟨ē⟩		o ⟨ō⟩	i͡e ⟨iē⟩	
Mid	ə ⟨e⟩				o͡ə ⟨ōe⟩
Open-mid	ɛ ⟨ë⟩		ɔ ⟨o⟩	i͡ɛ ⟨ië⟩	o͡ɔ ⟨ōo⟩
Open	a ⟨a⟩			i͡a ⟨ia⟩	

Stress may either fall on the penultimate or final syllable, reminiscent of the neighboring Hiw language.

== Grammar ==
Lo-Toga presents various forms of verb serialization.

The system of personal pronouns contrasts clusivity, and distinguishes three numbers (singular, dual, plural).

Together with its neighbour Hiw, Lo-Toga has developed a rich system of verbal number, whereby certain verbs change their root depending on the number of their main participant. Lo-Toga has 18 such pairs of verbs.

Spatial reference in Lo-Toga is based on a system of geocentric (absolute) directionals, which is in part typical of Oceanic languages, and yet innovative.

== Bibliography ==
- François, Alexandre (2005), "Unraveling the history of vowels in seventeen north Vanuatu languages" (PDF), Oceanic Linguistics, 44 (2): 443–504, CiteSeerX 10.1.1.395.4359, doi:10.1353/ol.2005.0034, S2CID 131668754
- —— (2010), "Pragmatic demotion and clause dependency: On two atypical subordinating strategies in Lo-Toga and Hiw (Torres, Vanuatu)" (PDF), in Bril, Isabelle (ed.), Clause hierarchy and Clause linking: The Syntax and Pragmatics interface, Amsterdam: Benjamins, pp. 499–548
- —— (2011), "Social ecology and language history in the northern Vanuatu linkage: A tale of divergence and convergence" (PDF), Journal of Historical Linguistics, 1 (2): 175–246, doi:10.1075/jhl.1.2.03fra, hdl:1885/29283
- —— (2012), "The dynamics of linguistic diversity: Egalitarian multilingualism and power imbalance among northern Vanuatu languages" (PDF), International Journal of the Sociology of Language, 2012 (214): 85–110, doi:10.1515/ijsl-2012-0022, S2CID 145208588
- —— (2015). "The ins and outs of up and down: Disentangling the nine geocentric space systems of Torres and Banks languages" (PDF). In Alexandre François; Sébastien Lacrampe; Michael Franjieh; Stefan Schnell (eds.). The languages of Vanuatu: Unity and diversity. Studies in the Languages of Island Melanesia. Canberra: Asia-Pacific Linguistics. pp. 137–195. hdl:1885/14819. ISBN 978-1-922185-23-5.
- —— (2016), "The historical morphology of personal pronouns in northern Vanuatu" (PDF), in Pozdniakov, Konstantin (ed.), Comparatisme et reconstruction : tendances actuelles, Faits de Langues, vol. 47, Bern: Peter Lang, pp. 25–60
- —— (2019). "Verbal number in Lo–Toga and Hiw: The emergence of a lexical paradigm" (PDF). Transactions of the Philological Society. 117 (3): 338–371. doi:10.1111/1467-968X.12168..
- —— (2021). "Presentation of the Lo-Toga language and audio archive". Pangloss Collection. Paris: CNRS.
