= Lombadan =

Lombadan (Persian: لمبدان), also rendered as Lompehdan, may refer to:

- Lombadan-e Balai
- Lombadan-e Hajjiabad
- Lombadan-e Pain
- Lombadan-e Sheykh Ahmad
