= Olly =

Olly, like the similarly spelt Ollie, is a variant of the given names Olivia and Oliver. Notable people and characters with this form of the name include:

== People ==
- Olly (born 2001), Italian singer-songwriter and rapper
- Olly Alexander (born 1990), British musician, actor, television presenter and LGBTQ advocate
- Olly Ashall-Bott (born 1997), English rugby league footballer who plays as a full-back or wing for the Widnes Vikings
- Olly Cracknell (born 1994), Welsh rugby union player who plays for Ospreys regional team as a flanker
- Olly Croft (1929–2019), darts administrator
- Olly Dondokambey (born 1961), Indonesian politician
- Olly Donner (1881–1956), Finnish writer
- Olly Flynn (born 1950), English race walker
- Olly Gebauer (1908–1937), Austrian film actress
- Olly Hicks, British kayaker, explorer and inspirational speaker
- Olly Holzmann (1915–1995), Austrian dancer and film actress
- Olly Kohn (born 1981), Welsh international rugby union player for Harlequins having previously played for Bristol and Plymouth Albion
- Olly Mann (born 1981), British presenter
- Olly Martins (born 1969), British politician
- Olly Moss (born 1987), English graphic artist
- Olly Murs (born 1984), English singer, songwriter, television presenter and dancer
- Olly Robinson (born 1991), English rugby union player who plays for Cardiff Blues as a flanker
- Olly Simpson (born 1998), Australian motorcycle racer
- Olly Stone (born 1993), English cricketer
- Olly Taylor (footballer) (born 1993), English footballer
- Olly Westbury (born 1997), English cricketer
- Olly Williams, British wildlife painter
- Olly Woodburn (born 1991), English rugby union player for Exeter Chiefs

== Characters ==
- Olly (mascot), one of the mascots of the 2000 Summer Olympics in Sydney
- Olly (Game of Thrones), in the Game of Thrones series
- Olly, a character in The Sifl and Olly Show
- Olly Manthrope-Hall, a character in the British soap opera EastEnders: E20
- King Olly, a character in Paper Mario: The Origami King

== Other uses ==
- Olly (company), a vitamins company

== See also ==
- Holly (disambiguation)
- Oli (disambiguation)
- Olle (disambiguation)
- Olli (disambiguation)
- Ollie (disambiguation)
- Ollywood, Odia-language film industry in India
- Oly (disambiguation)
