= Ollie =

Ollie is a given name and a nickname, often as a shortened form of Oliver, Olive, Olympia, Olga, or Olivia. Variants include Olie, Oli, Oly, and Olly.

== People ==
=== Given name ===
- Ollie Marie Adams (1925–1998), American gospel and R&B singer
- Ollie Bassett (born 1998), Northern Irish footballer
- Ollie Bostock (born 2007), Welsh footballer
- Ollie E. Brown (born 1953), American drummer and record producer
- Ollie Grieve (1920–1978), Australian rules footballer
- Ollie Halsall (1949–1992), British vibraphonist and guitarist
- Ollie Murray James (1871–1918), American Senator and Representative from Kentucky
- Ollie Johnson (basketball, born 1942), American basketball player
- Ollie Johnson (basketball, born 1949), American basketball player
- Ollie Kilkenny (born 1962), Irish hurler
- Ollie Kirkby (1886–1964), American actress
- Ollie Luba (born 1964), American systems and aerospace engineer, developer of GPS III
- Ollie Marquardt (1902–1968), American baseball player and manager
- Ollie Matson (1930–2011), American sprinter and football player
- Ollie Pearce (born 1995), English footballer
- Ollie Pope (born 1998), English cricketer
- Ollie Phillips (rugby union) (born 1983), English rugby union player
- Ollie le Roux (born 1973), South African rugby union footballer
- Ollie Imogene Shepard (1933–2016), pioneering American honky-tonk singer-songwriter
- Ollie Voigt (1899–1970), American baseball player

=== Olie ===
- Olie Cordill (1916–1988), American football player
- Olié Koffi, (born 1984), Ivorian footballer
- Olaf Kölzig (born 1970), German former ice hockey goaltender known as "Olie the Goalie"
- Olie Sundstrom (born 1968), retired Swedish ice hockey goaltender

=== Oliver ===
- Olly Alexander (born 1990), English singer, songwriter and actor, lead singer of the band Years & Years
- Ollie Allsopp (born 1998), English rugby union player
- Ollie Anderson (1879–1945), American baseball umpire
- Ollie Atkins — Oliver F. Atkins (1917–1977), American photographer
- Ollie Atkins (born 1988), Australian rugby union player
- Ollie Baker (born 1974), retired Irish hurler
- Ollie Banks (born 1992), English footballer
- Olly Barkley (born 1981), English rugby union player
- Ollie Bassett (born 1998), English-Northern Irish footballer
- Ollie Battersby (born 2001), English footballer
- Ollie Beard (1862–1887), American baseball player
- Ollie Bearman — Oliver Bearman (born 2005), British racing driver
- Ollie Betteridge (born 1996), British ice hockey player
- Ollie Brady, Irish Gaelic footballer
- Ollie Bridewell (1985–2007), British motorcycle racer
- Ollie J. Brooks (1872–1930), American artist
- Ollie Burton — Oliver Burton (1879–1929), English footballer
- Oliver Byrne (football chairman) (1944–2007), Irish football chairman
- Ollie Cahill (born 1975), Irish footballer
- Ollie Callan (born 2000), English-born Australian rugby union player
- Ollie Canning (born 1977), Irish hurler
- Ollie Carnegie (1899–1976), American professional baseball player
- Ollie Chenoweth (born 1992), English footballer
- Ollie Chessum (born 2000), English rugby union player
- Ollie Chill (1878–1958), American baseball umpire
- Ollie Clarke (born 1992), English footballer
- Ollie Cline (1925–2001), American football player
- Ollie Cook — Oliver Cook (born 1990), British rower
- Ollie Cooper (born 1999), English footballer
- Ollie Cooper (boxer) (born 2000), English professional boxer
- Ollie Collins (born 1972), Northern Irish hurler
- Ollie Conmy (1939–2014), Irish footballer
- Ollie Crankshaw (born 1998), English footballer
- Ollie Crinnigan (born 1947), Irish Gaelic footballer
- Ollie Davies (born 2000), Australian cricketer
- Ollie Darden (born 1944), American basketball player
- Ollie Devoto (born 1993), English rugby union player
- Ollie Dillard — Oliver W. Dillard (1926–2015), American general
- Ollie Dobbins (born 1941), American football player
- Ollie Fahy (born 1975), Irish hurler
- Ollie Freaney (1929–1991), Irish Gaelic footballer
- Ollie Freckingham (born 1988), English cricketer
- Ollie Gleichenhaus (1911–1991), American restaurateur
- Ollie Goss — Oliver Goss (born 1994), English-born Australian golfer
- Ollie Grieve (1920–1978), Australian rules footballer
- Ollie Griffiths (born 1995), Welsh rugby union player
- Ollie Hairs — Oli Hairs (born 1991), English-born Scottish cricketer
- Ollie Hall (1952–2020), Australian rugby union player and actor
- Ollie Hancock (born 1987), British racing driver
- Ollie Hardy — Oliver Hardy (1892–1957), American comic actor best known as half of the Laurel and Hardy duo
- Ollie Harrington (1912–1995), American cartoonist
- Ollie Hassell-Collins (born 1999), English rugby union player
- Ollie Hayes (born 1990), English rugby union player
- Ollie Haupt Jr. (1892–1984), American figure skater
- Ollie Heald (born 1975), Canadian association soccer player
- Ollie Hill (born 1989), British para-snowboarder and former motorcycle racer
- Ollie Hoare — Olli Hoare (born 1997), Australian middle-distance runner
- Ollie Hopkins (1935–2014), English footballer
- Ollie Horgan (1968–2025), Irish football manager
- Ollie Hoskins (rugby union) (born 1993), Australian rugby union player
- Ollie Hynd — Oliver Hynd (born 1994), British Paralympic swimmer
- Ollie Jackson (born 1984), British racing driver
- Ollie Johnson (basketball, born 1942), American college basketball player
- Ollie Johns (1879–1961), American baseball player
- Ollie Johnston (1912–2008), American film animator, one of Disney's famed "Nine Old Men"
- Ollie Kearns (born 1956), English professional footballer
- Ollie Kensdale (born 2000), English association footballer
- Ollie Kirk — Oliver Kirk (1884–1960), American Olympian boxer
- Ollie Kraehe (1898–1966), professional football player
- Ollie Lang — Oliver Lang, American paintball player
- Ollie Lawrence (born 1999), English rugby union player
- Olly Lee (born 1991), English footballer
- Ollie Lindsay-Hague (born 1990), English rugby union and sevens player
- Ollie Locke (born 1987), British reality television personality
- Ollie Lord (born 2002), Australian rules footballer
- Ollie Maclean (born 1998), New Zealand rower
- Ollie Mack (born 1957), American basketball player
- Ollie Mitchell (1927–2013), American musician
- Ollie Moran (born 1975), Irish hurler
- Ollie Muldoon (born 1994), English footballer
- Ollie Murphy, Gaelic football player and farmer
- Ollie Newton (born 1988), New Zealand cricketer
- Ollie Nott (born 1995), English-born Canadian rugby union player
- Ollie Norris (born 1999), Australian-born New Zealand rugby union player
- Ollie Norris (footballer) (1929–2011), Northern Irish footballer and coach
- Ollie North — Oliver North (born 1943), American military officer and political commentator
- Ollie Olds (born 1993), Welsh rugby union player
- Ollie Olson, American sportspeople
- Ollie Palmer (born 1992), English footballer
- Ollie Payne (born 1999), English field hockey player
- Ollie Phillips (rugby union) (born 1982), English rugby union player
- Ollie Pickering (1870–1952), American baseball player
- Ollie Pidgley (born 1997), British racing driver
- Ollie Poole (1922–2009), American football player
- Ollie Pope (born 1998), English cricketer
- Ollie Powers (1886–1928), American musician
- Ollie Pringle (born 1992), New Zealand cricketer
- Ollie Price (born 2001), English cricketer
- Ollie Rafferty (1873–1922), American football player
- Ollie Rayner (born 1985), English cricketer
- Ollie Reilly (1936–2009), Irish Gaelic footballer
- Ollie Robinson (born 1993), English cricketer
- Ollie Robinson (cricketer, born 1998) (born 1998), English cricketer
- Ollie Ryan (born 1985), English footballer
- Ollie Sale (born 1995), English cricketer
- Ollie Sansen (1908–1987), American football player
- Ollie Satenstein (c. 1906–1959), American National Football League player
- Ollie Savatsky (1911–1989), American football player
- Ollie Sapsford (born 1995), New Zealand rugby union player
- Ollie Schniederjans (born 1993), American golfer
- Ollie Schriver (1879–1947), American sports shooter
- Ollie Sellers (1885-????), American film director
- Ollie Shenton (born 1997), English footballer
- Ollie Shepard (blues pianist) (1909–1960), American singer
- Ollie Shoaff (1923–2001), American basketball player
- Ollie Silva (1929–2004), American racing driver
- Ollie Sleightholme (born 2000), English rugby union player
- Ollie Smith (rugby union, born 1982), English rugby union player
- Ollie Smith (rugby union, born 2000), Scottish rugby union player
- Ollie Spencer (1931–1991), American National Football League player and assistant coach
- Ollie Speraw (1921–2014), American politician
- Ollie Steele (born 1993), English cricketer
- Ollie Stonham (born 2001), English rugby union player
- Ollie Sutton (born 2000), English cricketer
- Ollie Sykes (cricketer) (born 2005), English cricketer
- Ollie Tarvet (born 2003), British tennis player
- Ollie Tanner (born 2002), English footballer
- Oliver Taylor (boxer) (born 1938), Australian boxer
- Ollie Taylor (1947–2025), American basketball player
- Ollie Thompson (1900–1975), English footballer
- Ollie Thorley (born 1996), English rugby union player
- Ollie Tipton — Oliver Tipton (born 2003), English footballer
- Ollie Tucker (1902–1940), Major League Baseball player
- Ollie Turton (born 1992), English footballer
- Ollie Wallace — Oliver Wallace (1887–1963), British-American composer
- Ollie Walsh (1937–1996), Irish hurling goalkeeper
- Ollie Walsh (Dicksboro hurler) (born 1992), Irish hurler
- Ollie Watkins (born 1995), English footballer
- Ollie Webber (born 2000), English footballer
- Ollie Welf (1889–1967), American baseball player
- Ollie Whyte (born 2000), New Zealand footballer
- Ollie Willars (born 1990), British field hockey player
- Ollie Wilkin — Oliver Wilkin (born 1992), English cricketer
- Ollie Wines (born 1994), Australian rules footballer
- Ollie Woods — Oliver Wood (cyclist) (born 1995), British cyclist
- Ollie Wride (born 1989), British musician
- Ollie Wright (footballer, born 1999), English footballer
- Ollie Wright (footballer, born 2002), English footballer
- Ollie Wyman — Oliver Wyman (actor) (born 1966), American voice actor
- Ollie Younger (born 1999), English footballer

=== Olivia ===
- Ollie Rae (born 1988), Scottish cricketer

=== Olga ===
Olly Donner - Finnish writer

=== Other ===
- Alan Gelfand (born 1963), known by the nickname "Ollie", American inventor of the Ollie (skateboarding) trick
- Ian Holloway (born 1963), known by the nickname "Ollie", British football manager and former player

== Fictional characters ==
- Ollie in the American television show Kukla, Fran and Ollie
- Ollie in the British comic strip Ollie and Quentin
- Ollie in the Canadian animated series Ollie's Pack
- Olly in The Sifl and Olly Show, a television show on MTV
- Ollie, a rabbit from the American animated series Wonder Pets
- Ollie Akana, the Blue Ranger of Power Rangers Dino Fury
- Ollie Millar, in the British soap opera Doctors
- Ollie Morgan, in the British soap opera Hollyoaks
- Ollie Pesto, in the American animated series Bob's Burgers
- Ollie Phillips (Home and Away), in the Australian soap opera
- Ollie Reynolds, in the British soap opera Emmerdale
- Ollie the Tapir, Armstrong's Girlfriend from Jim Henson's Animal Show
- Ollie Williams, in the American animated series Family Guy
- Olie Miramond, Misha's deceased mother from the animated series Transformers: Energon
