= Ollie (disambiguation) =

Ollie is a given name and nickname.

Ollie may also refer to:

== People ==
- Ollie, Estonian singer
- Arthur Ollie (born 1941), American politician
- Kevin Ollie (born 1972), American basketball player and coach

== Places in the United States ==
- Ollie, Iowa, a city
- Ollie, Kentucky, an unincorporated community

== Other uses ==
- Ollie (skateboarding), a skateboarding trick
- Ollie's Bargain Outlet, a chain of retail stores in the United States

== See also ==
- Oli (disambiguation)
- Olle (disambiguation)
- Olli (disambiguation)
- Ollis (disambiguation)
- Olly (disambiguation)
- Oly (disambiguation)
