= Tenacious =

Tenacious may refer to:

== Ships ==
- HMS Tenacious (R45), a 1943 Royal Navy destroyer
- HMS Tenacious (1917), a British R-class destroyer (1916)
- RSS Tenacious, a Formidable-class frigate of the Republic of Singapore Navy
- USNS Tenacious, a United States Navy ocean surveillance ship
- SV Tenacious, a 2000 British sail training ship
- Tenacious (yacht), a racing yacht owned and skippered by Ted Turner and winner of the 1979 Fastnet Race

== Other uses ==
- Tenacious (horse), an American Thoroughbred racehorse
- Tenacious Records, a record label founded by percussionist Alphonse Mouzon

== See also ==
- Tenacious D, an American band started by Jack Black and Kyle Gass
- Tenacity (disambiguation)
