= Ollis =

Ollis is a surname. Notable people with the surname include:

- Bernard Ollis (born 1951), British-Australian artist
- Ian Ollis (born 1970), South African politician
- John Ollis (1839–1913), American politician
- Michael Ollis (1988–2013), United States Army soldier and Medal of Honor recipient
- Richard Ollis (born 1961), English cricketer
- William Ollis (1871–1940), English footballer

== See also ==
- Ollie (disambiguation)
- Ollis-class ferry, named in honor of Michael Ollis
