= Jamrag =

Jamrag (Persian: جمرگ), also rendered as Jamrak, may refer to:

- Jamrag-e Shomali (North Jamrag)

== See also ==
- Some Time in New York City, an album containing a song "Jamrag"
