= Jabrani =

Village in Bushehr province, Iran

Jabrani Persian: جبراني
- Village
- Location within Iran
- Coordinates: 27°51′05″N 51°48′10″E
- Country: Iran
- Province: Bushehr
- County: Deyr
- District: Central
- Rural District: Owli

Population (2016)
  - Total: 289
- Time zone: UTC+3:30 (IRST)

Jabrani (Persian: جبراني) (Note: Also romanized as Jabrānī; also known as Jabrā’ī-ye Bālā and Jabrānī-ye Bālā) is a village in Owli Rural District of the Central District in Deyr County, Bushehr province, Iran.

== Demographics ==
=== Population ===
At the time of the 2006 National Census, the village's population was 183 in 46 households, when it was in Howmeh Rural District. The following census in 2011 counted 184 people in 49 households. The 2016 census measured the population of the village as 289 people in 67 households, by which time the village had been transferred to Owli Rural District created in the district.
