= Oli =

Oli or OLI may refer to:

== Places ==
- Oli-ye Jonubi, a village in Bushehr Province, Iran
- Oli-ye Shomali, a village in Bushehr Province, Iran

== People ==
- Óli, a Faroese and Icelandic given name
- Oliver (given name), nickname
- Oli (footballer), a retired Spanish footballer
- Oli (hip hop), part of French hip hop duo Bigflo & Oli
- Oli Udoh (born 1997), American football player
- KP Sharma Oli (born 1952), 38th Prime Minister of Nepal

== Other uses ==
- Cyclone Oli
- Oli 968, Singaporean radio station
- OLI-model or Eclectic Paradigm, a theory in economics
- Operational Land Imager, instrument on Landsat
- Operation Lifesaver, a railroad safety program
- Organizational Load Index, metric used by VoloMetrix

== See also ==
- Olle (disambiguation)
- Olli (disambiguation)
- Oly (disambiguation)
