= Lombadan-e Sheykh Ahmad =

Lombadan-e Sheykh Ahmad لمبدان شيخ احمد
- Village
- Interactive map of Lombadan-e Sheykh Ahmad
- Country: Iran
- Province: Bushehr
- County: Deyr
- Bakhsh: Central
- Rural District: Howmeh

Population (2006)
  - Total: 11
- Time zone: UTC+3:30 (IRST)
  - Summer (DST): UTC+4:30 (IRDT)

Lombadan-e Sheykh Ahmad (Persian: لمبدان شيخ احمد, also Romanized as Lombadān-e Sheykh Aḩmad) is a village in Howmeh Rural District, in the Central District of Deyr County, Bushehr Province, Iran. At the 2006 census, its population was 11, in 4 families.
