= Cyclone Ului =

Category 5 Australian region cyclone in 2010

Severe Tropical Cyclone Ului
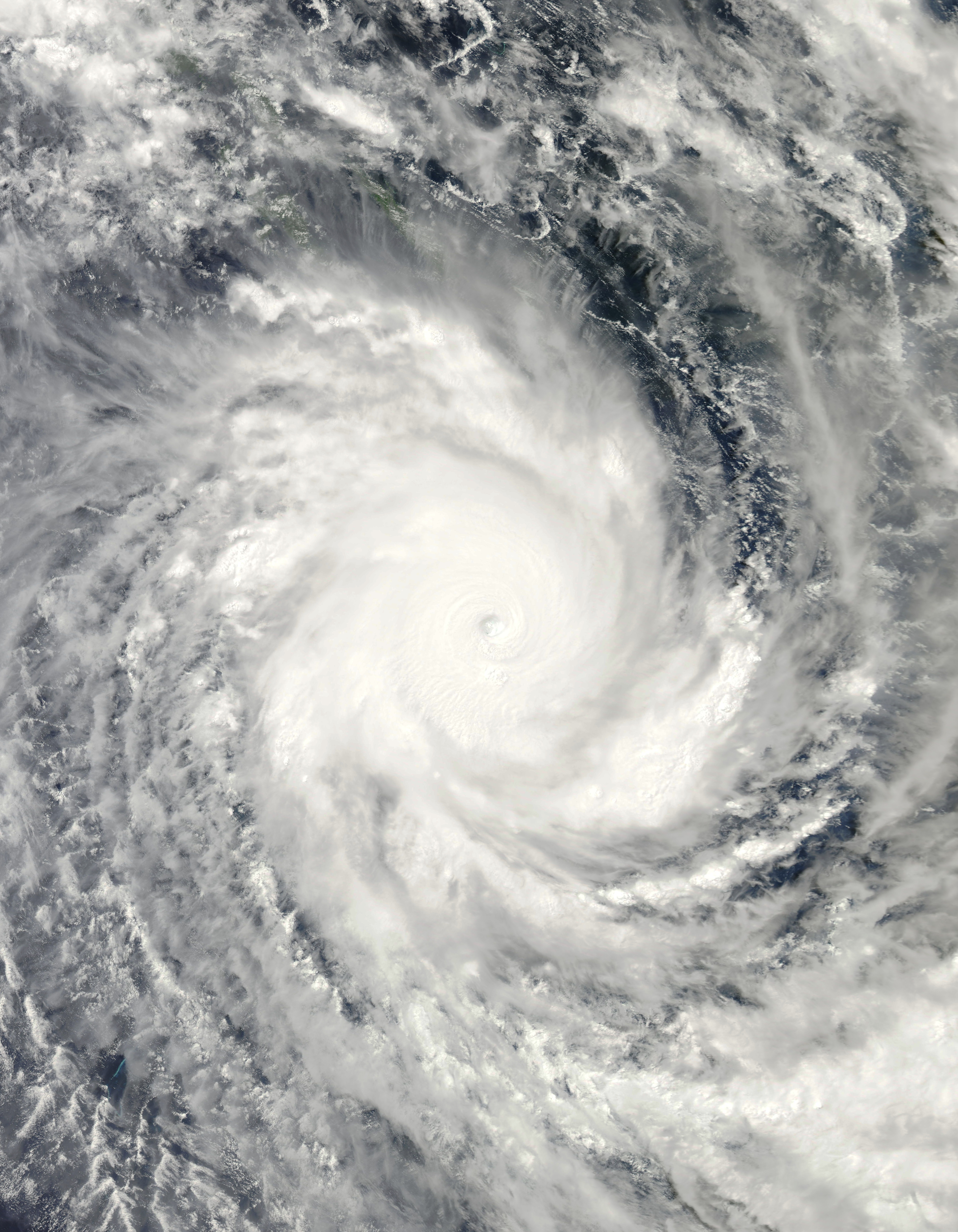
- Ului near peak intensity on 14 March 2010

Meteorological history
- Formed: 9 March 2010
- Dissipated: 21 March 2010

Category 5 severe tropical cyclone
- 10-minute sustained (FMS)
- Highest winds: 215 km/h (130 mph)
- Lowest pressure: 915 hPa (mbar); 27.02 inHg

Category 5-equivalent tropical cyclone
- 1-minute sustained (SSHWS/JTWC)
- Highest winds: 260 km/h (160 mph)
- Lowest pressure: 918 hPa (mbar); 27.11 inHg

Overall effects
- Fatalities: 1 direct
- Damage: $72 million (2010 USD)
- Areas affected: Vanuatu, Solomon Islands and coastal Queensland
- IBTrACS
- Part of the 2009–10 South Pacific and Australian region cyclone seasons

Severe Tropical Cyclone Ului was one of the fastest intensifying tropical cyclones on record, strengthening from a tropical storm to a Category 5 equivalent cyclone within a 30-hour span in March 2010. Throughout Queensland, Australia, infrastructural damage from the storm amounted to A$20 million (US$18 million) and agricultural losses reached A$60 million (US$54 million).

== Meteorological history ==
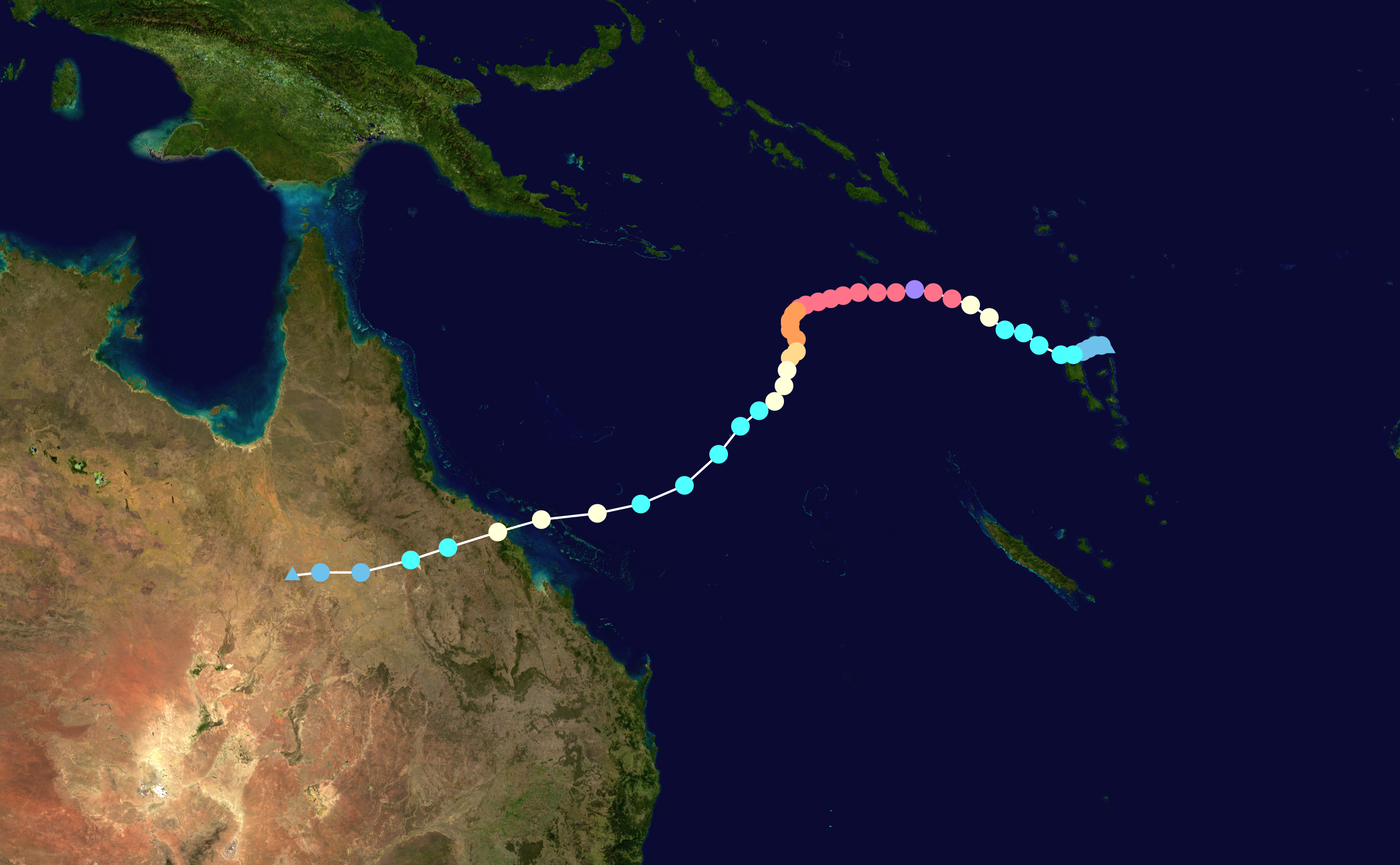
Map plotting the storm's track and intensity, according to the Saffir–Simpson scale Map key Saffir–Simpson scale Tropical depression (≤38 mph, ≤62 km/h) Tropical storm (39–73 mph, 63–118 km/h) Category 1 (74–95 mph, 119–153 km/h) Category 2 (96–110 mph, 154–177 km/h) Category 3 (111–129 mph, 178–208 km/h) Category 4 (130–156 mph, 209–251 km/h) Category 5 (≥157 mph, ≥252 km/h) Unknown Storm type Tropical cyclone Subtropical cyclone Extratropical cyclone, remnant low, tropical disturbance, or monsoon depression

Severe Tropical Cyclone Ului was first identified by the Fiji Meteorological Service (FMS) late on 9 March 2010 roughly 130 kilometres (81 mi) north of Hiw Island, Vanuatu. At that time, the system was classified as Tropical Disturbance 13F. Early the following day, the system became sufficiently organised for the FMS to upgrade the disturbance to a tropical depression. Several hours later, the Joint Typhoon Warning Center (JTWC) also began monitoring the system. By this time, deep convection had developed around a low-level circulation and banding features had formed. A slow westward movement was expected as the depression was situated north of a subtropical ridge.

On 12 March, 13F was upgraded to Tropical Cyclone Ului. By early on 13 March, it was a category 2 cyclone. Later that day, Ului strengthened into a category 3, making it a severe tropical cyclone. The storm continued to strengthen throughout the day and that night it became a category 5. Ului became the first category 5 South Pacific cyclone since Severe Tropical Cyclone Percy in February 2005 but weakened to category 4 about the time it crossed the 160°E meridian. Ului was predicted to restrengthen back into a category 5 as it moved away from an upper-level low and Severe Tropical Cyclone Tomas; however Ului remained as a category 4 and had weakened to a category 3 system in the early hours of 18 March. It weakened further to category 2 for a while before regaining category 3 strength. Early on 21 March (local time) it crossed the outlying Whitsunday Islands and made landfall near Airlie Beach, Queensland with winds of 150 km/h (95 mph).

Infrared satellite loop of Cyclone Ului undergoing rapid intensification from 13 to 14 March

== Preparations ==
=== Solomon Islands ===
As the storm approached the Solomon Islands, officials advised that most vessels remain at port due to rough seas produced by Ului. Search and rescue personnel were also placed on standby. On 16 March, UNICEF announced that they would supply the Solomon Islands with relief funds following the passage of the cyclone. During the passage of the storm, airport officials cancelled many flights due to dangerous weather conditions. These cancellations took place over a two-day span, leaving many passengers stranded during the storm.

=== Australia ===
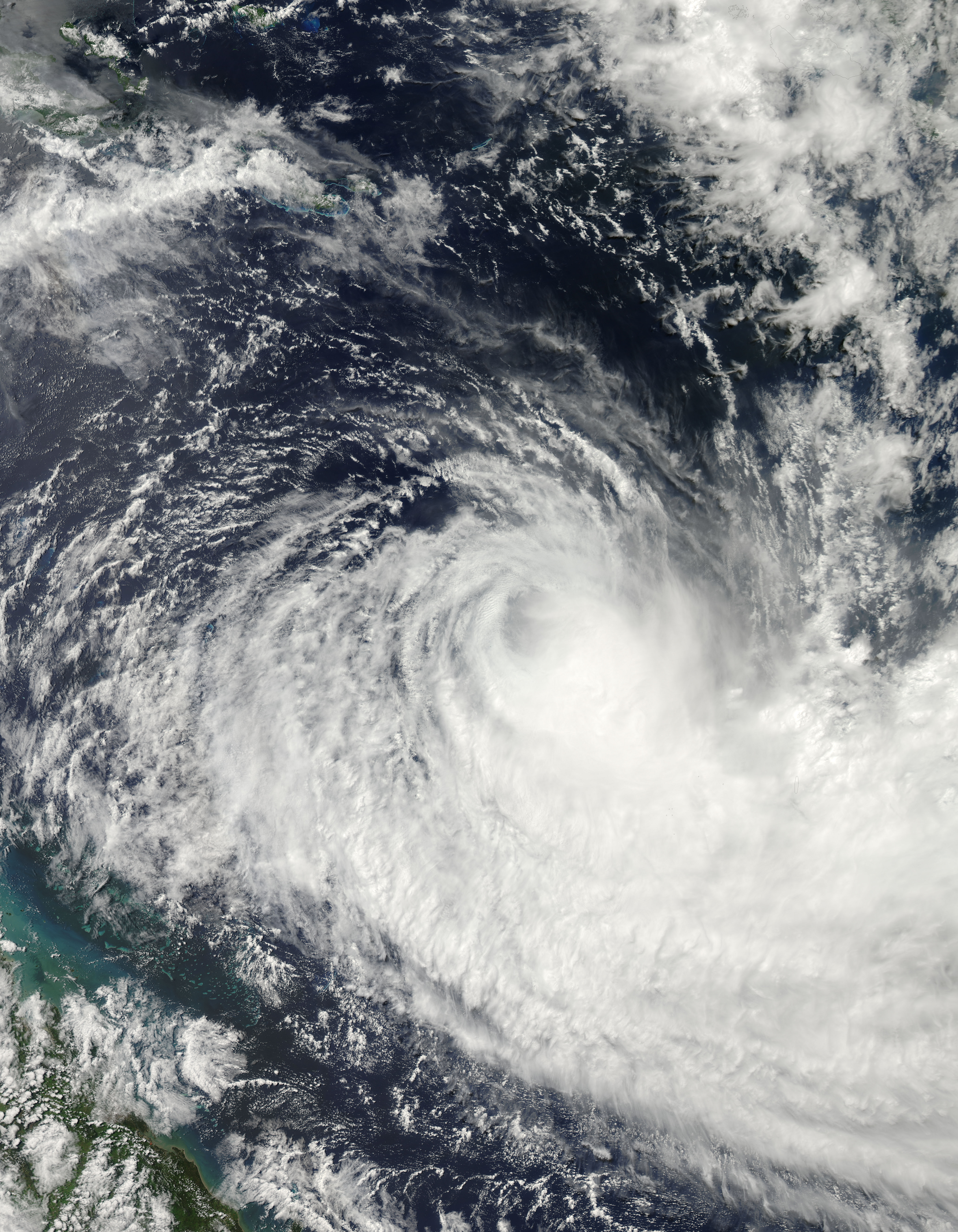
Satellite image of Cyclone Ului approaching Queensland on 19 March, with a partially exposed center

After Cyclone Ului passed through the Solomon Islands, officials in Queensland, Australia began warning residents about the possibility of the storm making landfall in the region. Large swells produced by the system prompted lifeguards to close large areas of public beaches. People who wanted to go into the ocean were strongly urged to only do so in patrolled areas. Additionally, fishermen removed their shark nets from the region in anticipation of winds exceeding 65 km/h (40 mph). The removal of shark nets was a first in preparation for cyclones. Although the removal of the nets would prevent damage to them from the storm, it left swimmers at risk for shark attacks. A large surfing competition, the Australian Surf Life Saving Championships, welcomed the large swells from the storm, estimated at 5 m (16 ft). Roughly 8,100 people signed up for the competition; however, managers stated that if the swells continued to increase, they may have to relocate the event elsewhere. These swells were anticipated to be the largest experienced along the Queensland coastline in the past decade and emergency management officials warned residents living along coastal areas that the waves would likely inundate low-lying regions.

On 18 March, new forecasts of the future track of Ului indicated that it would make landfall in Queensland. As a result, officials evacuated roughly 300 people from the islands of Heron and Lady Elliot, situated about 1,000 km (620 mi) off the Australian mainland. Residents along the Sunshine Coast were advised to prepare their homes for a possible Category 4 cyclone and stock up on non-perishable foods. Later on 18 March, the Bureau of Meteorology expected that the cyclone would cross or near the Queensland coast, between Cardwell and Mackay, on 21 March as a category 3 cyclone. on 19 March, Ului was downgraded to a category 2 cyclone. Several ports along the Queensland coastline were shut down for several days as large waves impacted the region. Transportation of coal and other raw materials was halted in these areas as well. On 21 March, the cyclone weakened as it moved inland and was downgraded below cyclone strength. 60,000 homes were without power in Cannonvale, Mackay, Proserpine, Sarina and surrounding areas. A National Rugby League match in the region threatened by Ului was started roughly two hours early to avoid playing during the storm.

== Impact ==
=== Solomon Islands ===
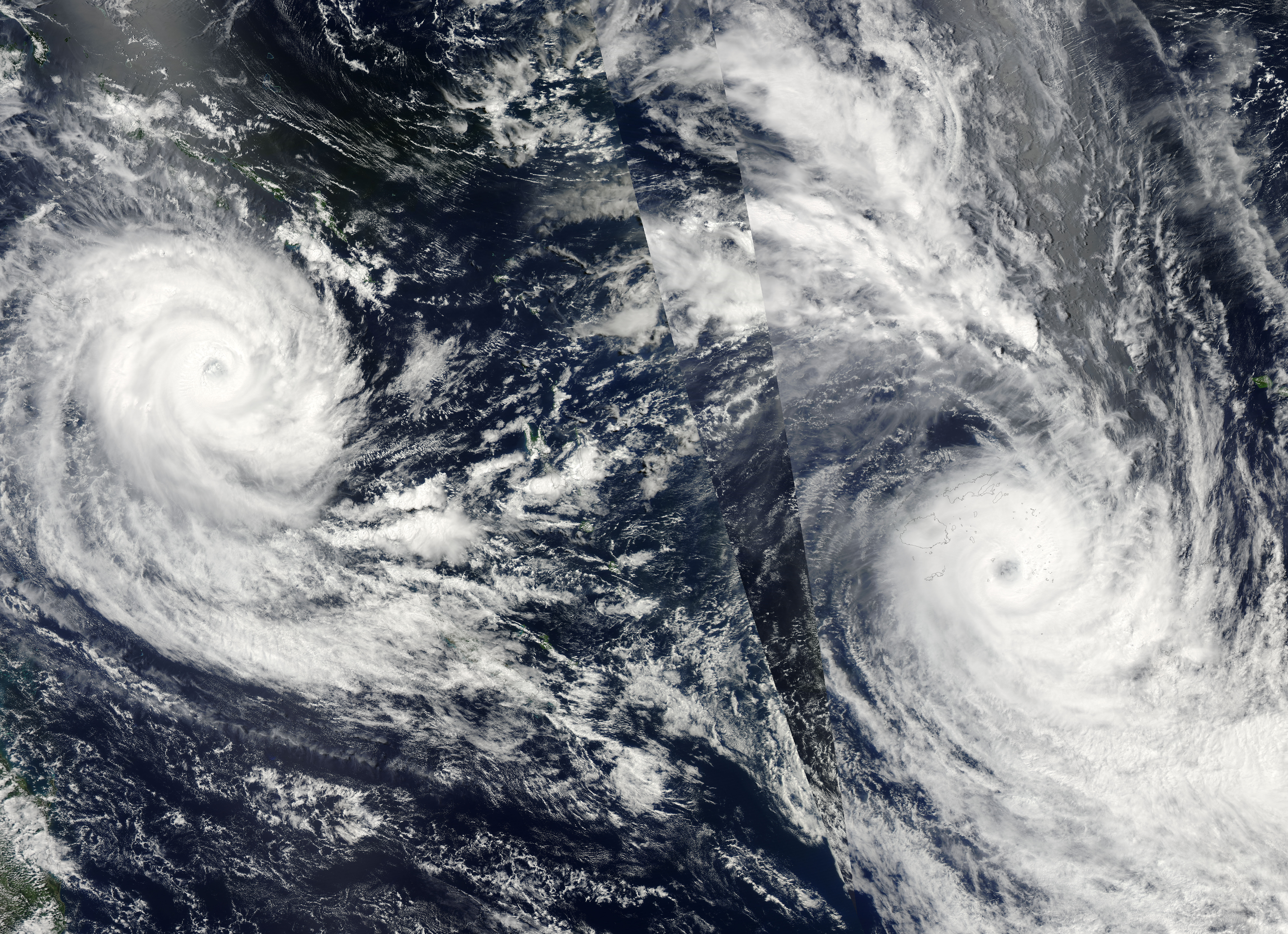
Cyclones Ului (left) and Tomas (right) on 16 March

As a Category 5 cyclone, Ului passed through the southern Solomon Islands, causing severe damage on the islands of Rennell and Guadalcanal as well as Bellona province. Large swells produced by the storm washed away several homes along coastal areas. Flooding was also reported on several islands; however, officials confirmed that no fatalities resulted from the storm. Maximum winds on the affected islands reached 120 km/h (75 mph). On Rennell Island, initial reports stated that at least ten homes had been severely damaged or destroyed in several villages. Light to moderate damage was sustained on Makira and Guadalcanal, with at least two homes sustaining damage. Unconfirmed reports of a large wave inundating several villages, washing away homes and overturning large boulders came from east Makira around 4:00 pm local time. Another village on the western side of Makira was reportedly inundated roughly five hours later. Later damage assessments made on Makira Island confirmed at least 13 homes were destroyed and several more were damaged. The most severe damage took place in Woau village where ten homes were destroyed.

=== Australia ===
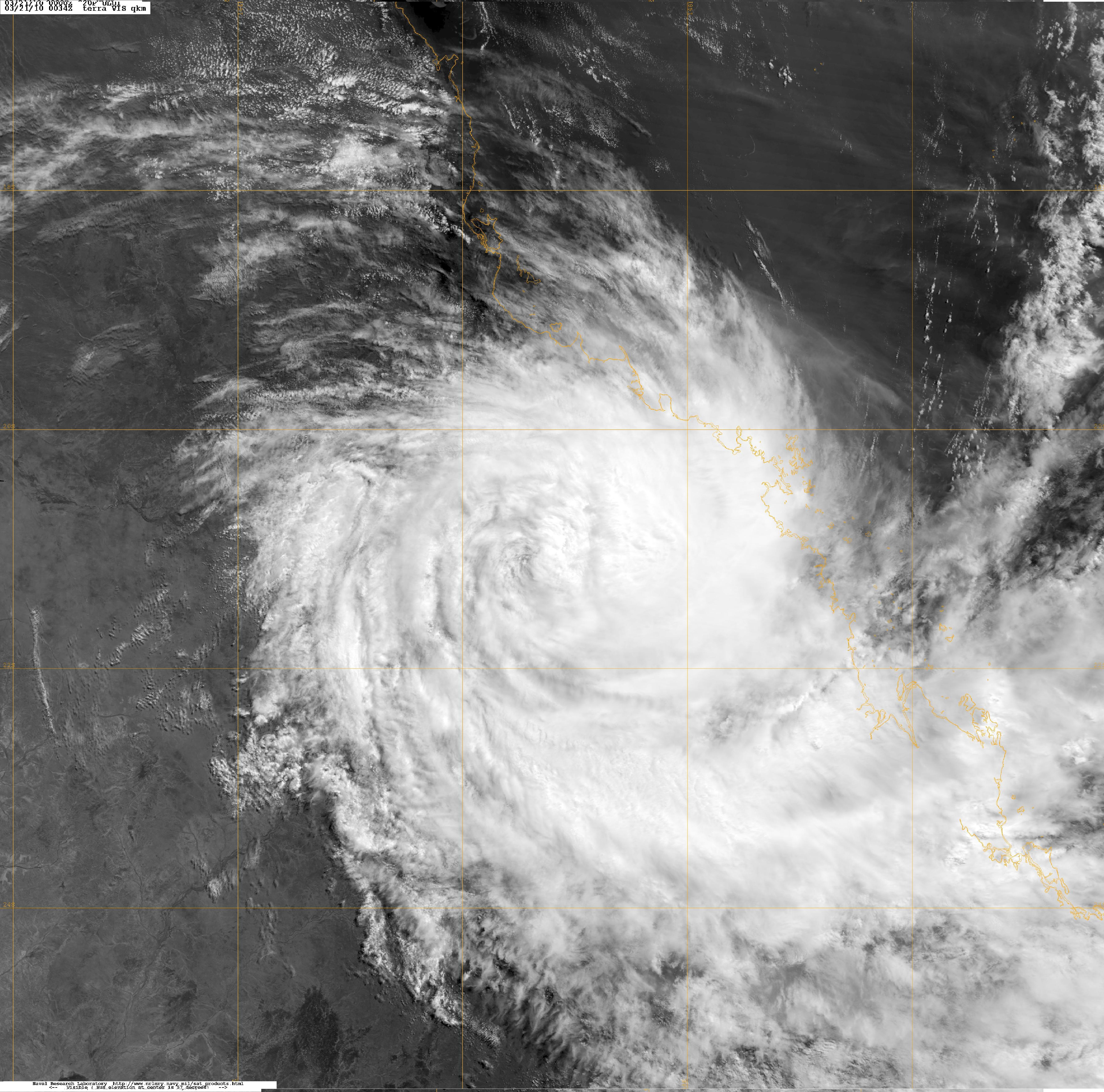
Cyclone Ului after making landfall in Queensland on 21 March

On 19 March, a teenage surf lifesaver, Saxon Bird, was knocked off his surf ski amidst 2 m (6.6 ft) waves produced by Ului. After being struck by his ski, he was transported to a local hospital before dying from his injuries hours later. As a result of his death, the water events of the Australian Surf Life Saving championships at Kurrawa Beach on the Gold Coast were cancelled. The system made landfall near Airlie Beach, north of Mackay, at about 1:30 am AEST on Sunday morning, 21 March and headed in a SSW direction maintaining category 3 status until it reached roughly halfway between Proserpine, Queensland and Collinsville, Queensland.

Authorities said there were reports of roof damage and powerlines down communities throughout the region. 60,000 homes were reported to be without power between Mackay, Proserpine and Collinsville. Some sites reported over 400 mm of rain in 24 hours.

== Aftermath and records ==
Between 13 and 14 March, Cyclone Ului underwent an unusually explosive phase of rapid intensification. During a 24-hour span, the system intensified from a tropical storm to a Category 5 equivalent cyclone, tying Hurricane Wilma in 2005 for the fastest intensification of a system from tropical storm to Category 5. According to the JTWC, maximum sustained winds increased from 100 km/h (60 mph) to 260 km/h (160 mph). They also estimated that the storm's minimal central pressure had decreased from 982 mbar (hPa) to 918 mbar (hPa), a drop of 64 mbar (hPa), during this span.

== See also ==
- List of the most intense tropical cyclones
- 2009–10 South Pacific cyclone season
  - Cyclone Pat
- 2009–10 Australian region cyclone season
- Cyclone Yasi
- Cyclone Ita
