= Jamrag-e Shomali =

Jamrag-e Shomali جمرگ شمالي
- Village
- Location within Iran
- Coordinates: 27°57′03″N 51°52′46″E
- Country: Iran
- Province: Bushehr
- County: Deyr
- Bakhsh: Central
- Rural District: Howmeh

Population (2006)
  - Total: 30
- Time zone: UTC+3:30 (IRST)
  - Summer (DST): UTC+4:30 (IRDT)

Jamrag-e Shomali (Persian: جمرگ شمالي, also Romanized as Jamrag-e Shomālī; also known as Jamrak-e Shomālī) is a village in Howmeh Rural District, in the Central District of Deyr County, Bushehr Province, Iran. At the 2006 census, its population was 30, in 4 families.
