= Cyclone Tomas =

Category 4 South Pacific cyclone in 2010

Severe Tropical Cyclone Tomas
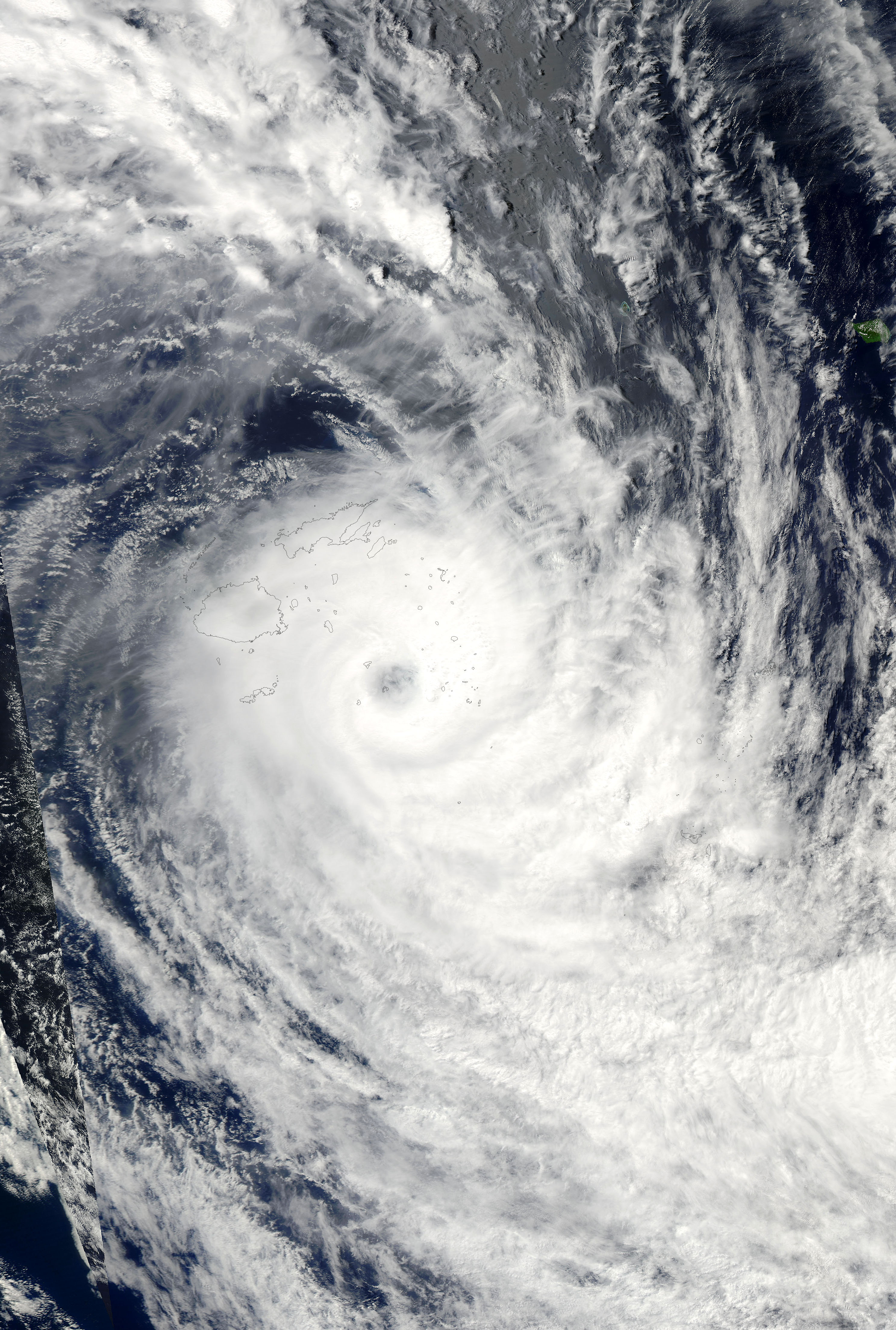
- Cyclone Tomas near peak intensity off the coast of Vanua Levu, Fiji

Meteorological history
- Formed: March 9, 2010
- Extratropical: March 17, 2010
- Dissipated: March 20, 2010

Category 4 severe tropical cyclone
- 10-minute sustained (FMS)
- Highest winds: 185 km/h (115 mph)
- Lowest pressure: 925 hPa (mbar); 27.32 inHg

Category 4-equivalent tropical cyclone
- 1-minute sustained (SSHWS/JTWC)
- Highest winds: 215 km/h (130 mph)
- Lowest pressure: 937 hPa (mbar); 27.67 inHg

Overall effects
- Fatalities: 3 total
- Damage: $45 million (2010 USD)
- Areas affected: Fiji
- IBTrACS
- Part of the 2009–10 South Pacific cyclone season

Severe Tropical Cyclone Tomas was the most intense tropical cyclone to strike Fiji since Cyclone Bebe in 1972. Forming out of a tropical disturbance on March 9, 2010, designated 14F by the Fiji Meteorological Service, the system gradually organized within an environment favoring intensification. By March 11, the disturbance had strengthened sufficiently to be classified as Tropical Cyclone Tomas, the eighth named storm of the 2009–10 South Pacific cyclone season. Modest intensification took place over the following few days, with the system attaining severe tropical cyclone status on March 13. On March 14, Tomas began to impact parts of Fiji while continuing to gain strength. As it passed near Vanua Levu on March 15, the cyclone attained its peak intensity with winds of 175 km/h (110 mph) and a pressure of 930 hPa (mbar) according to the FMS. At the same time, the Joint Typhoon Warning Center assessed it as a Category 4 equivalent storm with 1-minute sustained winds of 215 km/h (135 mph).

Cyclone Tomas proved to be very destructive throughout Fiji, leaving many homeless and entire villages under water. At least one person was confirmed to have been killed by the storm after being swept out to sea while rescuing family members. Reports from outlying islands stated that entire homes had been flattened by wind gusts up to 280 km/h (170 mph).

== Meteorological history ==
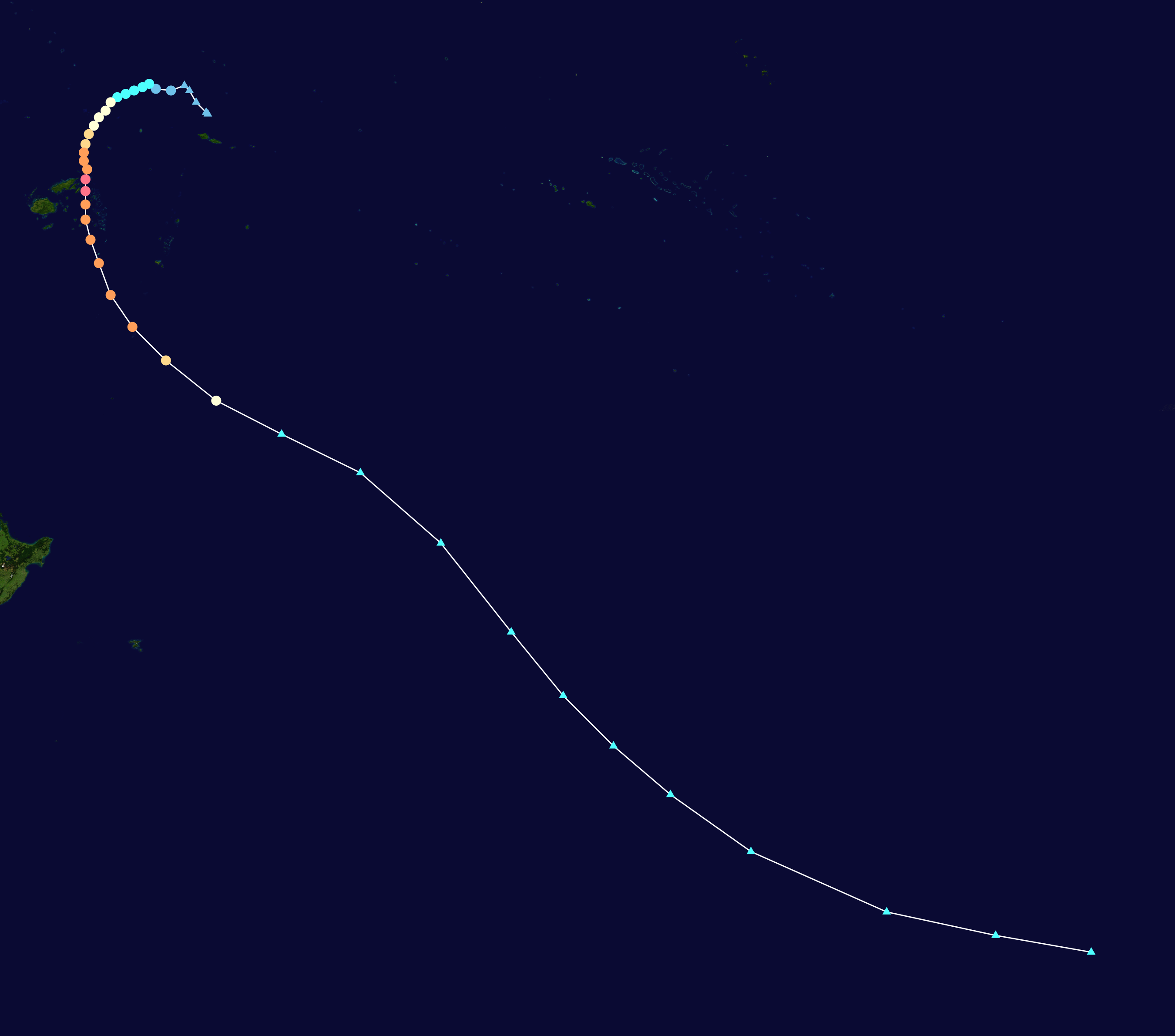
Map plotting the storm's track and intensity, according to the Saffir–Simpson scale Map key Saffir–Simpson scale Tropical depression (≤38 mph, ≤62 km/h) Tropical storm (39–73 mph, 63–118 km/h) Category 1 (74–95 mph, 119–153 km/h) Category 2 (96–110 mph, 154–177 km/h) Category 3 (111–129 mph, 178–208 km/h) Category 4 (130–156 mph, 209–251 km/h) Category 5 (≥157 mph, ≥252 km/h) Unknown Storm type Tropical cyclone Subtropical cyclone Extratropical cyclone, remnant low, tropical disturbance, or monsoon depression

On March 9, the Fiji Meteorological Service (FMS) reported that Tropical Disturbance 14F had developed about 95 km (60 mi) to the northwest of Pago Pago in American Samoa. Over the next day, the system moved north-westwards in a marginal environment for further development with weak vertical windshear, while atmospheric convection consolidated around a developing low-level circulation center. As a result, the FMS classified the system as a tropical depression before the United States Joint Typhoon Warning Center issued a tropical cyclone formation alert on the system.

Located within an environment characterized by low wind shear, further intensification was anticipated as convection continued to develop over the expanding system. Around 1500 UTC on March 11, the JTWC issued their first advisory on the cyclone, classifying it as Tropical Storm 19P. Several hours later, the FMS upgraded the system to a Category 1 cyclone and gave it the name Tomas. Rapid intensification was expected to take place over the following 48 hours as sea surface temperatures ahead of the storm averaged 30 °C (86 °F), well-above the threshold for tropical cyclone development.

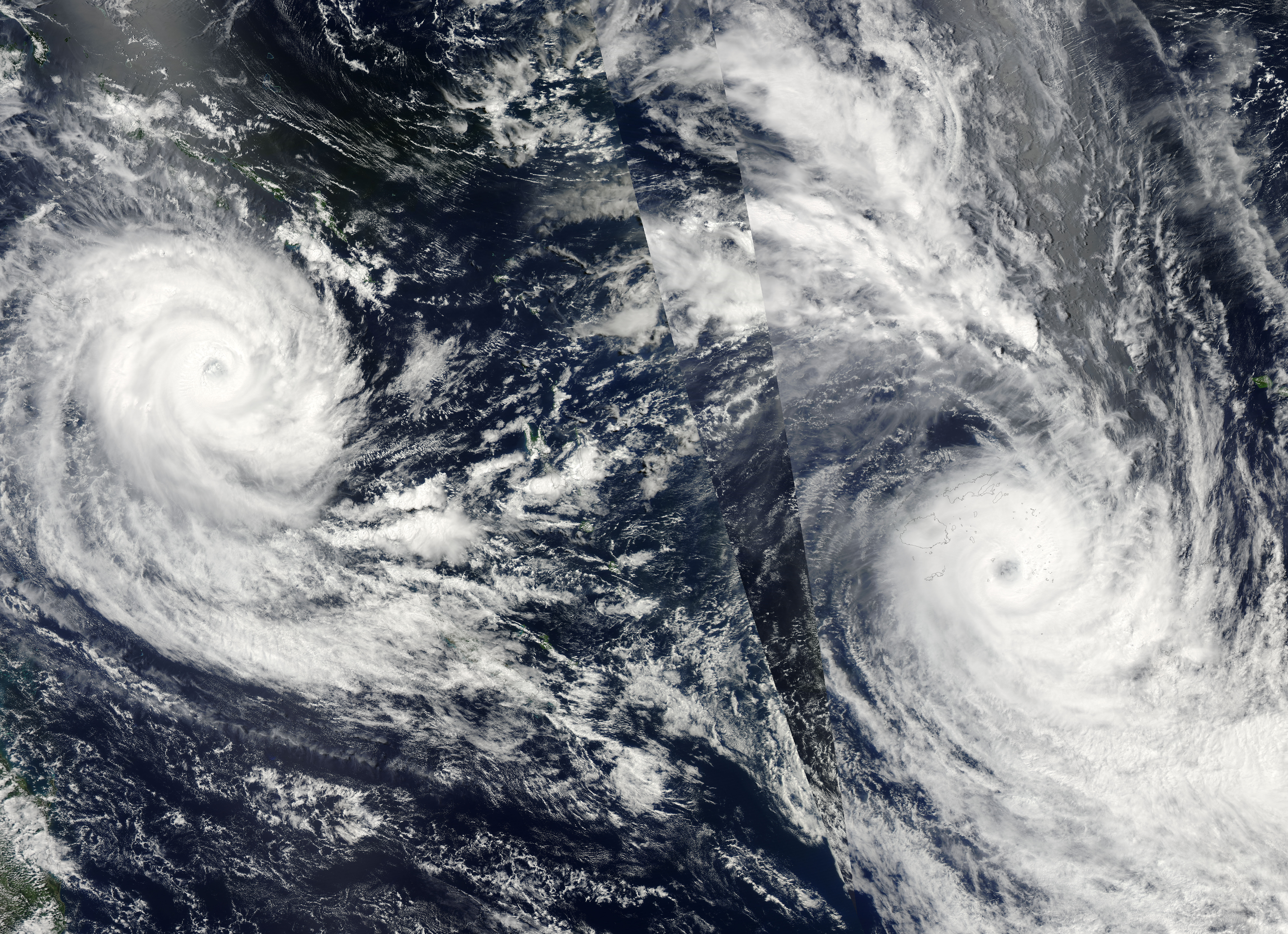
Cyclones Tomas (right) and Ului (left) on 16 March

Throughout the day on March 12, Tomas steadily intensified, and early the next day, the JTWC upgraded the storm to a Category 1 equivalent hurricane with winds of 120 km/h (75 mph). Convective banding substantially increased on March 13, allowing Tomas to become the fourth severe tropical cyclone of the season early the next morning. Around the same time, the JTWC assessed the storm to have attained winds of 155 km/h (95 mph), ranking it as a Category 2 cyclone. By the afternoon of March 14, Tomas had developed a banding-eye feature surrounded by deep convection. At this point, the FMS assessed the storm to have winds of 150 km/h (95 mph) and a pressure of 950 hPa (mbar). The JTWC also noted further intensification, upgrading Tomas to a Category 3 equivalent storm. As it passed near Vanua Levu on March 15, the cyclone attained its peak intensity with winds of 175 km/h (110 mph) and a pressure of 930 hPa (mbar) according to the FMS. At the same time, the Joint Typhoon Warning Center assessed it as a Category 4 equivalent storm with 1-minute sustained winds of 215 km/h (135 mph).

On March 16, Tomas moved out of FMS's area of responsibility, who passed the primary warning responsibility for Tomas to New Zealand's MetService. Tomas extratropical remnants were last noted on March 20, after they had moved across 120°W and out of MetService's area of responsibility.

== Impact ==
=== Wallis and Futuna ===
On March 10, the FMS issued a tropical cyclone alert for the whole of Wallis and Futuna, as the system was expected to cause gale-force winds over the french territory within 24 - 48 hours.

On its way, the cyclone has passed near Futuna island, heavily damaging an important part of houses and other buildings and cutting the water and electricity supply, but leaving no human casualties. The most severed was the north-eastern part of the island and notably the village of Poi and its surroundings. There, the islands only road was washed away and most of the houses were completely demolished by strong wind and rising waves.

=== Fiji ===
One person was killed on Vanua Levu after being swept out to sea by large swells while trying to rescue her two sisters, a niece and a nephew near Namilamila Bay.

In the northernmost islands of Fiji, communication with Cikobia and Qelelevu was lost on March 15 as the cyclone passed through the region. Officials feared that severe damage and loss of life occurred on the island. Many homes along rivers and the Pacific were washed away by rising waters and tides exceeding 7 m (23 ft). Parts of the region have been soaked with upwards of 350 mm (14 in) of rain over a two-day span with more falling. Power and running water was disrupted to numerous islands, forcing thousands to seek shelter. During the initial assessment of damage, at least 50 homes were confirmed to have been destroyed by Tomas. This prompted Fijian officials to declare a State of disaster for the northern and eastern divisions of Fiji.

After the storm, the governments of New Zealand and Australia each sent $1 million in their respective currencies to Fiji. The New Zealand Air Force sent relief supplies, including tarps and water purifying equipment.

== See also ==
- Cyclone Pat
- Cyclone Ami
