= Owli Rural District =

Rural district in Bushehr province, Iran

Owli Rural District Persian: دهستان اولي
- Rural District
- Location within Iran
- Coordinates: 27°54′N 51°49′E
- Country: Iran
- Province: Bushehr
- County: Deyr
- District: Central
- Established: 2013
- Capital: Owli-ye Shomali

Population (2016)
  - Total: 1,960
- Time zone: UTC+3:30 (IRST)

Owli Rural District (Persian: دهستان اولي) is in the Central District of Deyr County, Bushehr province, Iran. Its capital is the village of Owli-ye Shomali.

== History ==
Owli Rural District was created in the Central District in 2013.

== Demographics ==
=== Population ===
At the time of the 2016 National Census, the rural district's population was 1,960 in 406 households. The most populous of its six villages was Owli-ye Shomali, with 1,269 people.

=== Other villages in the rural district ===
- Jabrani
- Owli-ye Jonubi
