= Olli (disambiguation) =

Olli is a children's book character.

Olli may also refer to:

== People with the surname ==
- Egil Olli (born 1949), Norwegian politician for the Labour Party
- Harri Olli (born 1985), Finnish ski jumper who has been competing since 2002
- Simo-Pekka Olli (born 1985), professional volleyball player from Finland

== People with the given name ==
- Olli Harder, New Zealand association football coach and former player
- Olli Huttunen (born 1960), Finnish football coach and former goalkeeper
- Olli Huttunen (biathlete) (1915–1940), Finnish skier
- Olli Jokinen (born 1978), Finnish professional ice hockey player
- Olli Kanervisto (1958–1984), Finnish shot putter
- Olli Kinkkonen (1881–1918), Finnish American working man lynched in Duluth
- Olli Kolehmainen (born 1967), Finnish sprint canoeist
- Olli Kortekangas (born 1955), Finnish composer from Turku
- Olli Kunnari (born 1982), Finnish volleyball player
- Olli Lounasmaa (1930–2002), Finnish academician, experimental physicist and neuroscientist
- Olli Määttä (born 1994), Finnish professional ice hockey defenseman
- Olli Malmivaara (born 1982), Finnish professional ice hockey defenceman
- Olli Mannermaa (1921–1998), Finnish interior architect
- Olli Muotka (born 1988), Finnish ski jumper and former Nordic combined athlete
- Olli Mustonen (born 1967), Finnish pianist, conductor and composer
- Olli Partanen (1922–2014), Finnish former discus thrower
- Olli Puhakka (1916–1989), one of the top scoring aces in the Finnish Air Force
- Olli Rahnasto (born 1965), retired professional tennis player from Finland
- Olli Rehn (born 1962), Finnish politician, currently European Commissioner for Economic and Financial Affairs
- Olli Remes (1909–1942), Finnish cross country skier and military officer
- Olli Saarela (born 1965), Finnish film director
- Olli Toomik (born 1938), Estonian physician and politician
- Olli Tukiainen, a Finnish musician and the guitarist of the rock band Poets of the Fall
- Olli Tuominen (born 1979), professional squash player who represented Finland
- Olli Ungvere (1906–1991), Estonian actress and singer
- Olli Vänskä (born 1981), Finnish violinist of Folk metal band Turisas
- Olli Wisdom, British music artist, currently residing in London
- Olli-Markus Taivainen (born 1989), Finnish ski-orienteering competitor and World Champion
- Olli-Matti Multamäki (1948–2007), commander of the Finnish Army
- Olli-Pekka Kallasvuo (born 1953), president and chief executive officer of Nokia Corporation
- Olli-Pekka Karjalainen (born 1980), Finnish hammer thrower
- Olli-Pekka Ojansivu (born 1988), Finland professional volleyball player

== Other uses ==
- Osher Lifelong Learning Institutes
- Olli, an autonomous shuttle bus made by Local Motors
- OlliOlli, a skateboarding video game

== See also ==
- Oli (disambiguation)
- Olle (disambiguation)
- Ollie (disambiguation)
- Olly (disambiguation)
- Oly (disambiguation)
