= Olly Hicks =

British adventurer

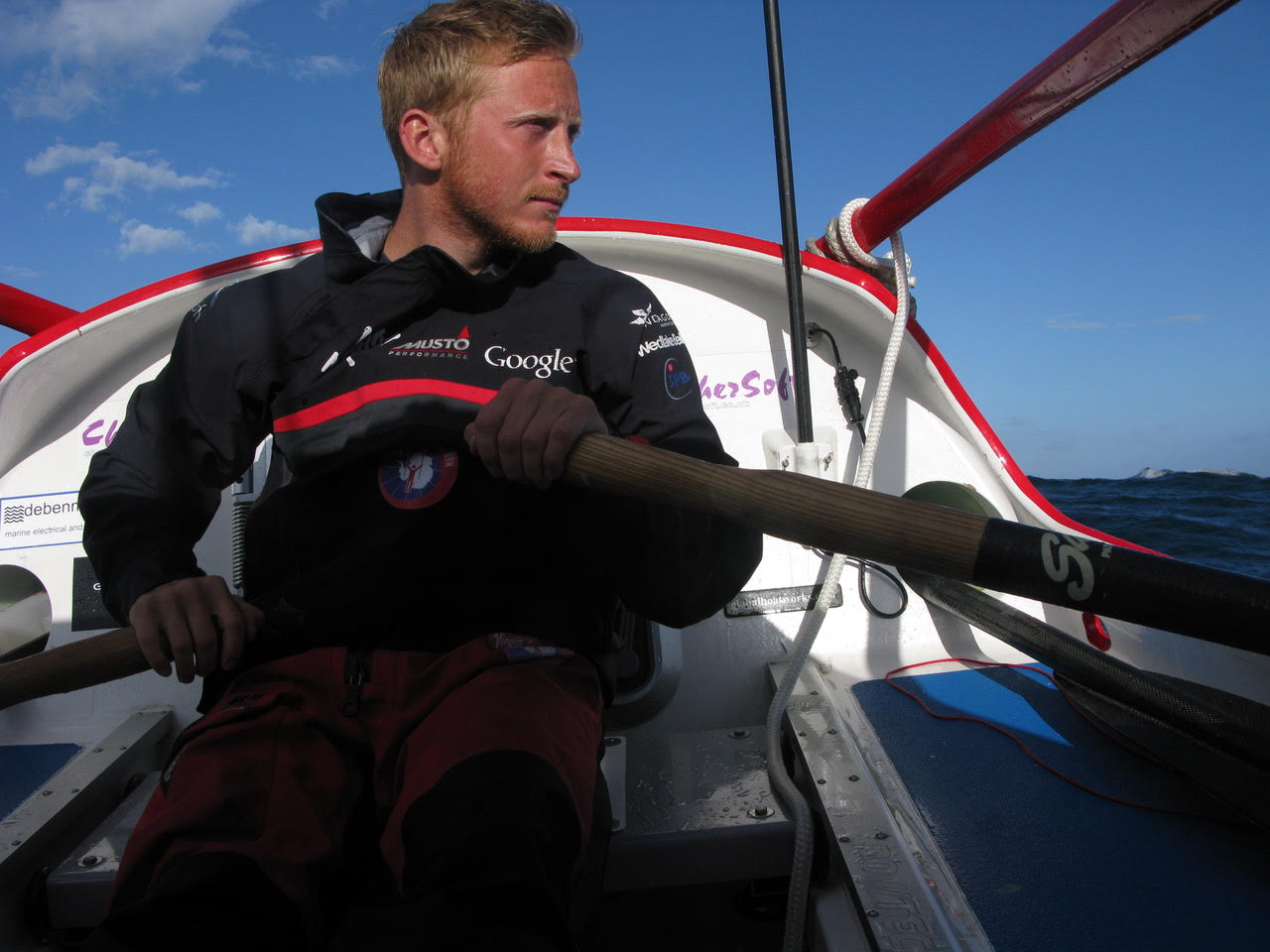

Oliver "Olly" Hicks (born 3 December 1981) is a British ocean rower, kayaker, explorer and inspirational speaker. He holds three world records for adventure. He is best known for his solo ocean rows and extreme kayak voyages. He first made the headlines after his solo trans-Atlantic voyage in 2005 when he became the first and currently only person to row from America to England solo and the youngest person to row any ocean solo. Hicks has rowed and paddled over 7,000 miles on ocean expeditions since 2005. Over 6,000 miles and 220 days alone at sea.

Hicks currently works as an inspirational and motivational speaker.

== Biography ==
The eldest of four children, Hicks grew up in London and Suffolk. He has run a marquee business, and a rural services business and worked in executive search and for a renewable energy business.

Hicks has produced three adventure documentaries and is an ambassador for Bremont Watches.

== Expeditions ==
=== North Atlantic Solo - 2005 (Virgin Row) ===
In 2005 at the age of 23, after 124 days at sea, Hicks became the first person to row from America to England solo and the youngest person to row any ocean solo. Hicks was welcomed into Falmouth harbour by Prince William of Wales and Richard Branson. This was made into a documentary, called Virgin Row after its sponsors; it won first prize in the Moscow Film Festival's adventure category.

For this voyage Hicks was also awarded the Peter Bird Trophy for Tenacity and endurance at the Dijon Adventure Film Festival.

=== Tasman Sea 2009 – (Virgin Global Row) ===
In 2009 Hicks made an attempt to be the first person to row solo around the world. The voyage was unsuccessful due to boat problems and instead he became the first to row from Tasmania to New Zealand after 96 days alone at sea. A film of this project was produced by Hicks and director George Olver, titled Tenacity on the Tasman, which was screened at the Odeon Leicester Square in 2009.

=== Southern Ocean and Antarctic sailing ===
Hicks has sailed extensively in the Southern Ocean, often working aboard the expedition yacht Pelagic Australis which regularly visits Cape Horn, the Antarctic peninsula, the Falklands and South Georgia. In 2008 he was part of the National Geographic Oceans 8 expedition to document climate change in the Antarctic aboard Pelagic Australis as part of a team led by American writer and film maker Jon Bowermaster.

=== Shetland Bus Memorial Expedition 2011 and 2012 ===
Between 2011 and 2013 Hicks was involved with several long distance sea kayak crossings. The first, in memory of the World War II Shetland Bus operation saw Hicks and teammates Mick Berwick and Patrick Winterton attempt to kayak unsupported from Shetland in Scotland 200 miles across to Bergen in Norway across the North Sea. The first two attempts were unsuccessful but Hicks and Winterton succeeded on their third attempt in a double sea kayak arriving in Bergen after 68 hours at sea.

=== Engelandvaarders 2011 ===
Hicks also the joined the 2012 Engelandvaarder re-enactment expedition, a supported sea kayak crossing of the North Sea from Katwijk in the Netherlands to Sizewell in Suffolk. The 100-mile (160 km) crossing took around 43 hours; only three of the six paddlers completed the journey, Hicks among them. This journey was to commemorate the Engelaandvaarders who had made the dangerous journey in World War II.

=== Greenland to Scotland Challenge 2016 ===
In the summer of 2016 Hicks planned and led the 1,500-mile (2,410 km) Greenland to Scotland Challenge – the first kayak journey from Greenland to Scotland in modern times – in a bid to prove that the Inuit may have made the journey in the 17th century. The inspiration came from Norman Rogers book, Searching for the Finmen.

Hicks and his teammate George Bullard took 66 days to island hop, unsupported, from the ice pack just south of Greenland, back to Iceland, anti-clockwise around the north coast and then across to the Faroe Islands, before heading down to Scotland via North Rona. Red Bull Media house made a film of the journey, Voyage of the Finnmen. Hicks and Bullard were recovered by an Icelandic fishing boat warning them of an impending hurricane on their way across the ‘Devils Dancefloor’ to the Faroes. The pair then worked their passage back to Iceland as fisherman on board. After waiting for good weather on the Faroes for three weeks the paddlers had to take refuge on the remote Scottish Island of North Rona where they were stranded by a storm and forced to live off the land. On 4 September they landed in Scotland at Balnakeil Bay.

The story of the Greenland to Scotland Challenge was presented at the Royal Geographical Society on 22 November 2016.
