= Owli-ye Jonubi =

Village in Bushehr province, Iran

Owli-ye Jonubi Persian: اولي جنوبي
- Village
- Location within Iran
- Coordinates: 27°50′10″N 51°53′59″E
- Country: Iran
- Province: Bushehr
- County: Deyr
- District: Central
- Rural District: Owli

Population (2016)
  - Total: 364
- Time zone: UTC+3:30 (IRST)

Owli-ye Jonubi (Persian: اولي جنوبي) (Note: Also romanized as Owlī-ye Jonūbī; also known as Olī-ye Jonūbī and Owlī-ye Soflá (اولي سفلي)) is a village in Owli Rural District of the Central District in Deyr County, Bushehr province, Iran.

== Demographics ==
=== Population ===
At the time of the 2006 National Census, the village's population was 311 in 62 households, when it was in Howmeh Rural District. The following census in 2011 counted 324 people in 72 households. The 2016 census measured the population of the village as 364 people in 110 households, by which time the village had been transferred to Owli Rural District created in the district.
