= Owli-ye Shomali =

Village in Bushehr province, Iran

Owli-ye Shomali Persian: اولي شمالي
- Village
- Location within Iran
- Coordinates: 27°50′28″N 51°53′25″E
- Country: Iran
- Province: Bushehr
- County: Deyr
- District: Central
- Rural District: Owli

Population (2016)
  - Total: 1,269
- Time zone: UTC+3:30 (IRST)

Owli-ye Shomali (Persian: اولي شمالي) (Note: Also romanized as Owlī-ye Shomālī; also known as Olī-ye Shomālī and Owlī-ye ‘Olyā (اولي عليا)) is a village in, and the capital of, Owli Rural District in the Central District of Deyr County, Bushehr province, Iran.

== Demographics ==
=== Population ===
At the time of the 2006 National Census, the village's population was 498 in 109 households, when it was in Howmeh Rural District. The following census in 2011 counted 679 people in 177 households. The 2016 census measured the population of the village as 1,269 people in 220 households, by which time the village had been transferred to Owli Rural District created in the district. It was the most populous village in its rural district.
