= Tenacity =

Tenacity may refer to:

- Tenacity (mineralogy) a mineral's resistance to breaking or deformation
- Tenacity (herbicide), a brand name for a selective herbicide
- Tenacity (textile strength)
- Tenacity (non-profit), an organization founded by Ned Eames
- Dream Chaser Tenacity, a spacecraft

== See also ==
- Tenacity on the Tasman, a 2009 documentary film
- W.T.F. (Wisdom, Tenacity and Focus), 2011 studio album by Vanilla Ice
- Sectility, a form of tenacity (mineralogy)
