= Dowrahak =

City in Bushehr province, Iran

Dowrahak Persian: دوراهک
- City
- Location within Iran
- Coordinates: 27°56′50″N 51°57′42″E
- Country: Iran
- Province: Bushehr
- County: Deyr
- District: Central
- Established as a city: 2012

Population (2016)
  - Total: 4,852
- Time zone: UTC+3:30 (IRST)

Dowrahak (Persian: دوراهک) (Note: Also romanized as Do Rāhak, Dorāhak, and Dowrāhak) is a city in the Central District of Deyr County, Bushehr province, Iran, serving as the administrative center for Howmeh Rural District.

== Demographics ==
=== Population ===
At the time of the 2006 National Census, Dowrahak's population was 3,841 in 787 households, when it was a village in Howmeh Rural District. The following census in 2011 counted 4,413 people in 1,127 households. The 2016 census measured the population as 4,852 people in 1,361 households, by which time Dowrahak had been elevated to the status of a city.
