= Cyclone Pat =

Category 3 South Pacific cyclone in 2010

Severe Tropical Cyclone Pat
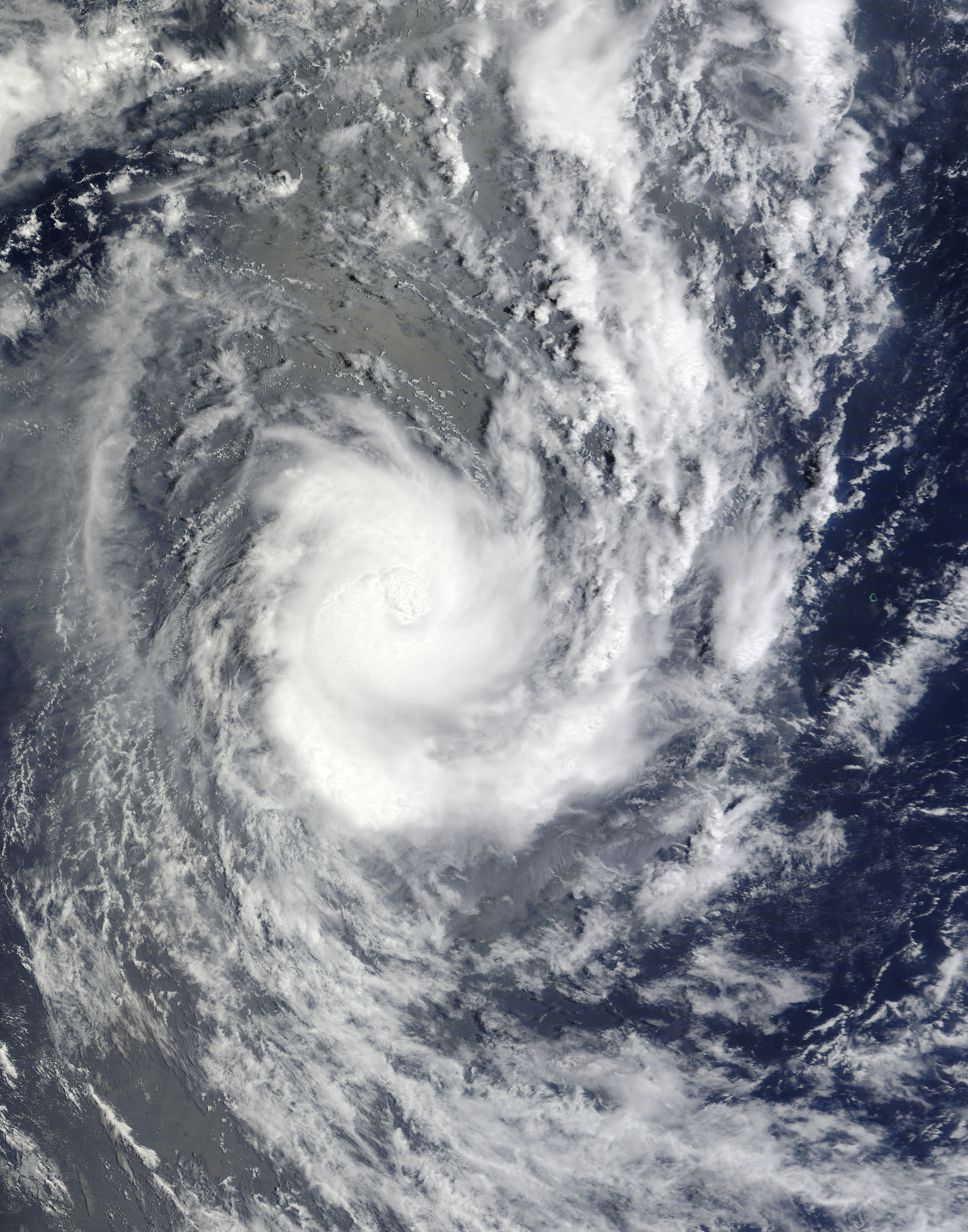
- Cyclone Pat strengthening on February 9

Meteorological history
- Formed: February 6, 2010
- Dissipated: February 12, 2010

Category 3 severe tropical cyclone
- 10-minute sustained (FMS)
- Highest winds: 140 km/h (85 mph)
- Lowest pressure: 960 hPa (mbar); 28.35 inHg

Category 2-equivalent tropical cyclone
- 1-minute sustained (SSHWS/JTWC)
- Highest winds: 165 km/h (105 mph)

Overall effects
- Fatalities: None
- Damage: $13.7 million (2010 USD)
- Areas affected: Cook Islands, particularly Aitutaki
- IBTrACS
- Part of the 2009–10 South Pacific cyclone season

Severe Tropical Cyclone Pat was a small but strong tropical cyclone that passed directly over Aitutaki, (Note: Aitutaki is a small atoll comprising several islands with a total land area of 18.05 km^{2} (6.96 mi^{2}) which surround a 50 km^{2} (19.3 mi^{2}) lagoon. It has a population of 1,771.) Cook Islands, in southern Pacific Ocean on February 10, 2010. (Note: All mentions of dates are in accordance with Coordinated Universal Time for consistency, unless otherwise noted.) Part of a series of storms to impact the group of islands early that year, Pat was first identified as a tropical depression on February 6 well to the northeast of the Samoan Islands. The storm steadily organized as it moved generally southeast, becoming a tropical cyclone on February 8. Turning to the south, intensification began in earnest and the system acquired hurricane-force winds within 48 hours of being named. The 445 km (275 mi) wide system displayed annular characteristics and a 19 km (12 mi) wide eye. Pat reached its peak strength early on February 10 as a severe tropical cyclone with winds of 140 km/h (85 mph) and a barometric pressure of 960 mbar (hPa; 28.35 inHg). (Note: All winds are in ten-minute sustained standards unless otherwise noted) Hours later it struck Aitutaki, producing gusts in excess of 185 km/h (115 mph) on the island. Hostile wind shear then prompted rapid weakening of the cyclone. The system degraded below gale-intensity on February 11, just 24 hours after it peaked, and was last noted early on February 12.

Battering Aitutaki with wind gusts in excess of 185 km/h (115 mph), Cyclone Pat devastated the island. Approximately 78 percent of homes were damaged, with 72 structures destroyed. The electrical grid was left completely offline and supply of water was largely lost. Agriculture also experienced tremendous impact, with most crops completely lost. Damage on Aitutaki amounted to US$13.7 million; (Note: All monetary amounts are in 2010 values of their respective currencies.) however, casualties were minimal with only eight minor injuries reported. Recovery efforts began immediately after the storm, with the Red Cross and the Government of New Zealand aiding the local government. A reconstruction plan was enacted by the Cook Islands within a month and subsequently funded by New Zealand. Owing to its destructive effects, the name Pat was later retired and replaced with Pili.

== Meteorological history ==
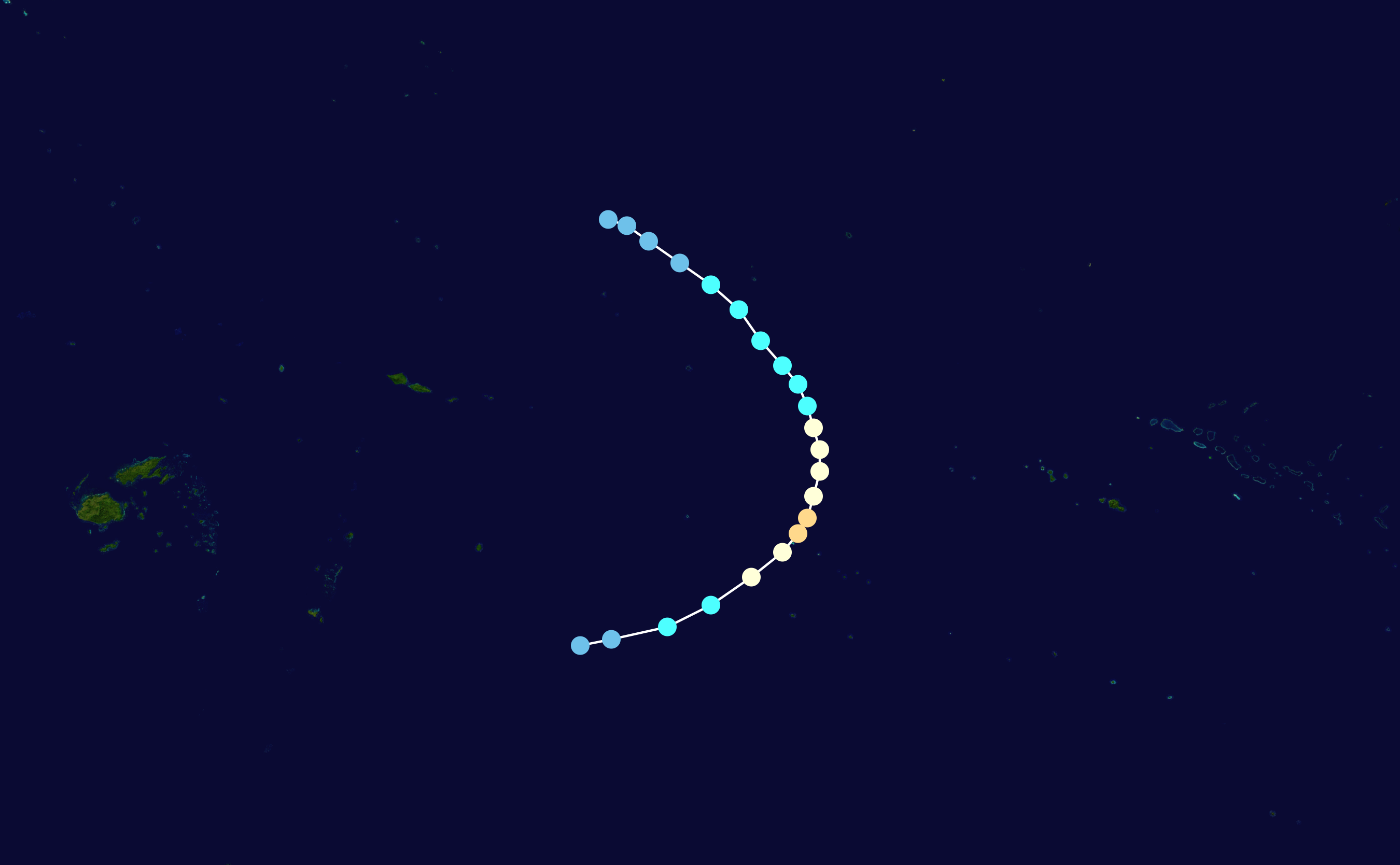
Map plotting the storm's track and intensity, according to the Saffir–Simpson scale Map key Saffir–Simpson scale Tropical depression (≤38 mph, ≤62 km/h) Tropical storm (39–73 mph, 63–118 km/h) Category 1 (74–95 mph, 119–153 km/h) Category 2 (96–110 mph, 154–177 km/h) Category 3 (111–129 mph, 178–208 km/h) Category 4 (130–156 mph, 209–251 km/h) Category 5 (≥157 mph, ≥252 km/h) Unknown Storm type Tropical cyclone Subtropical cyclone Extratropical cyclone, remnant low, tropical disturbance, or monsoon depression

Between January and March 2010, the Australian monsoon trough extended unusually far east over the southern Pacific Ocean. With above-average sea surface temperatures, stemming from a moderate-strength El Niño, multiple low-pressure systems were able to develop across the region. An unusual spree of tropical cyclogenesis in rapid succession ensued, including four hurricane-strength storms: Oli, Pat, Rene, and Tomas. On February 6, the Fiji Meteorological Service (FMS) began monitoring a tropical depression, dubbed 09F, well to the northeast of the Samoan Islands. (Note: The Fiji Meteorological Service is the Regional Specialized Meteorological Center for the Pacific Ocean between the equator and 25°S from 160°E to 120°W.) Embedded within a well-developed trough, the system displayed curved convective banding features. Environmental conditions in the area, including low wind shear, high ocean heat content, and upper-level outflow, favored cyclogenesis. Additionally, an active Madden–Julian oscillation phase moving into the region was expected to bolster development. Steady improvement of the system's convective structure ensued and early on February 7, the Joint Typhoon Warning Center (JTWC) issued a Tropical Cyclone Formation Alert. (Note: The Joint Typhoon Warning Center is a joint United States Navy – United States Air Force task force that issues tropical cyclone warnings for the southern Pacific Ocean and other regions.) The low trekked generally east-southeast in response to a near-equatorial ridge anchored to the north. The storm's appearance continued to improve and Dvorak classifications rose to T2.5, indicating gale-force winds were likely present. Accordingly, the JTWC began issuing advisories on the system at 18:00 UTC and dubbed it Tropical Cyclone 14P. Forecasters noted, however, that the small size of the cyclone could lead to erroneously low Dvorak estimates. The FMS followed suit six hours later and assigned the name Pat to the cyclone, assessing it as a Category 1 on the Australian cyclone scale.

Convection became increasingly symmetric on February 8, and a small eye feature appeared on microwave satellite imagery. Spanning no more than 445 km (275 mi), the developing storm began a gradual turn to the south as steering currents shifted from the equatorial ridge to a subtropical ridge. Based on increasing Dvorak numbers, the JTWC assessed Pat to have reached hurricane-intensity by 06:00 UTC on February 9. The eye feature became more pronounced throughout the day, with convection consolidating inward and becoming more symmetric. Accordingly, the FMS accordingly upgraded Pat to a Category 3 severe tropical cyclone by 18:00 UTC. The system became annular in nature on February 10, characterized by a lack of prominent banding features and uniform convection which surrounded its 19 km (12 mi) wide eye. Pat reached its peak intensity at 06:00 UTC that day as it began turning to the southwest. Maximum winds were estimated at 140 km/h (85 mph) alongside a barometric pressure of 960 mbar (hPa; 28.35 inHg). At the same time, the JTWC assessed Pat to have been a Category 2-equivalent on the Saffir–Simpson hurricane scale with one-minute sustained winds of 165 km/h (105 mph). Weakening began shortly thereafter as wind shear over the system increased. Pat passed directly over the island of Aitutaki between 12:00 and 18:00 UTC.

The low-level center of Pat began decoupling from convection late on February 10 once it cleared Aitutaki. The storm rapidly weakened amid strong shear, with the center being left completely exposed early on February 11. A solitary band remained along the south side of the storm by that time, and the FMS no longer considered it a tropical cyclone after 06:00 UTC. The lone band of convection dissipated later that day and with no residual thunderstorm activity, the skeletal low turned westward in response to westerly flow. The JTWC maintained Pat as a tropical storm until 18:00 UTC and as a tropical depression until its dissipation early on February 12.

== Preparations ==
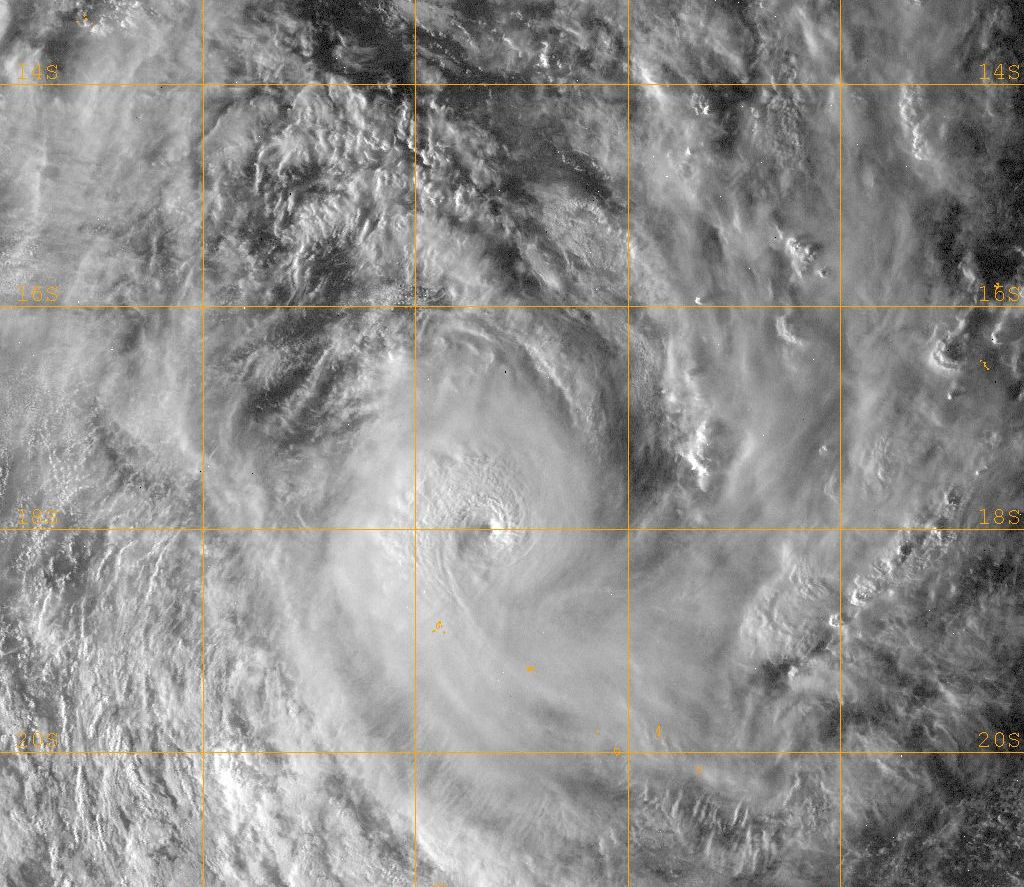
Visible satellite image of Cyclone Pat around its peak intensity early on February 10

Starting on February 7, tropical cyclone alerts and later gale warnings were issued for the Northern Cook Islands under the anticipation of gale-force winds impacting populated islands. The first of these islands were Manihiki, Rakahanga, and Suwarrow. As the storm moved southward, the advisories shifted accordingly. Strong wind warnings were raised for Pukapuka, Nassau, and Penrhyn on February 8; however, they were dropped later that day as Cyclone Pat moved away. Alerts on potential gales in the southern Cook Islands also began on February 8, including the islands of Atiu, Aitutaki, Manuae, Mitiaro, and Takutea. Gale warnings for Aitutaki, Palmerston, and Rarotonga began on February 9 and extended to Mauke the next day. Early on February 10, a hurricane warning was issued for Aitutaki. With the core of Pat's destructive winds forecast to pass close to or over the island, sustained winds of 140 km/h (85 mph) and gusts of 185 km/h (115 mph) were anticipated. The aforementioned warnings were allowed to expire once Pat cleared the Cook Islands on February 11 and was no longer a threat.

Emergency centers were prepped across the northern Cook Islands on February 8. The Cook Islands Chapter of the Red Cross took early action with Cyclone Pat and began stockpiling relief supplies on February 9. Volunteers from the organization assisted elderly residents with preparation and evacuation on Aitutaki. Anticipating high winds, residents tied down homes with rope and wire and boarded up windows with shutters. Similar preparations took place on Rarotonga, though the main concern there was storm surge. Government offices and schools there were closed on February 11. Most residents and all tourists along the coast in Aitutaki evacuated inland to designated shelters. Authorities later announced that they were under-prepared for Cyclone Pat. The lack of an official process during an emergency was cited as a core issue.

== Impact ==
Passing directly over Aitutaki on February 10, Pat produced wind gusts in excess of 185 km/h (115 mph) making it one of the most powerful storms ever experienced by residents on the island. It is also considered among the most damaging on the island. Aitutaki Mayor Tai Herman claimed the winds to be much stronger, with gusts up to 240 km/h (150 mph) during the worst of the storm. These winds were above building codes at the time, which required structures to be able to withstand winds of 176 km/h (109 mph). Numerous trees and power lines fell amid the powerful winds, cutting power to the entirety of the island and severing communications. According to the Government of the Cook Islands, 78 percent of the homes on the island sustained damage. Of the 277 affected homes, 59 sustained minor damage, 51 moderate, 95 major, and 72 were destroyed. Severity of damage correlated with the age of each home, with buildings over 25 years old suffering the greatest impact. Collateral damage took place when debris from damaged or destroyed structures became airborne and struck other buildings. Hardest hit were the villages of Nikaupara and Tautu. Costs to homes amounted to NZ$15 million (US$10.6 million).

One building at the Seventh Day Adventist church primary school collapsed while another sustained severe damage. Although damage occurred at Vaitau School, it was utilized as an evacuation shelter. The primary school and college in Araura also suffered damage. The island's electrically run water supply was substantially effected. A total of 568 homes lost access to clean water, with many waters tanks damaged or destroyed. Aitutaki's only hospital fared well through the storm, with some roof damage and flooded rooms. Infrastructural losses totaled to NZ$2.3 million (US$1.6 million), mainly stemming from the power grid. The agricultural sector sustained extensive damage, amounting to US$1.5 million, with some crops experiencing a total loss. The severity of damage raised concerns about food security in the months after the storm. Particularly hard-hit was the mango crop, which was to be harvested two weeks after Pat struck. Approximately 60–75 percent of the coconut trees and 75 percent of java plum, mango, and kapok trees sustained damage. Most trees had at least one branch torn off and in most cases, multiple branches. Additionally, the blue lorikeet (Vini peruviana), a bird native to French Polynesia and the Cook Islands, population suffered dramatic losses due to the storm, with the population on Aitutaki dropping by more than 50 percent.

All told, losses from Pat amounted to US$13.7 million. However, Dr. Russell Howorth from the Secretariat of the Pacific Community (SPC) stated that damage reached US$8.2 million. In comparison, the collective damage from cyclones in the Cook Islands since 1955 was US$47 million according to the SPC. In contrast to the severity of damage, no fatalities and only eight minor injuries took place.

Fearing similar damage to Aitutaki, a pre-emptive state of emergency was issued for Rarotonga. This was soon lifted as Pat ultimately spared Rarotonga and little damage took place there. Gale-force winds and heavy rains impacted Rarotonga and Palmerston islands. Large swells affected Penrhyn atoll, interfering with a study of marine turtles.

== Aftermath ==
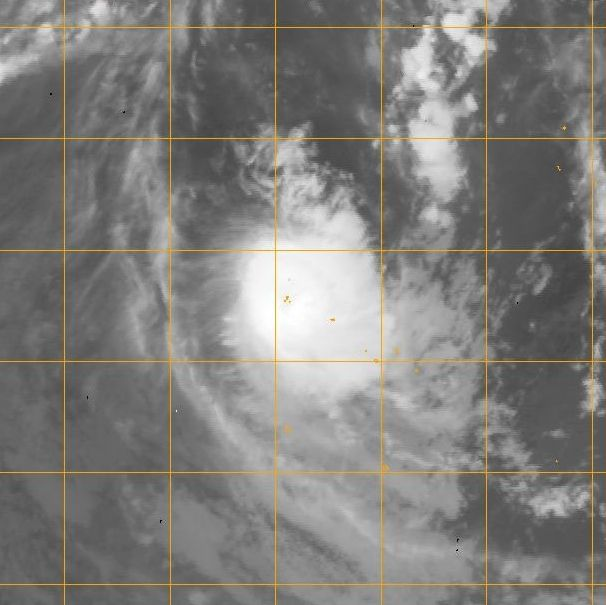
Infrared satellite image of Cyclone Pat as it passed over Aitutaki on February 10

Immediately following Pat's passage, the Government of the Cook Islands declared Aitutaki a disaster zone. In accordance with the FRANZ agreement, the Government of New Zealand made an initial donation of NZ$350,000 for recovery efforts prior to the formal request for assistance on February 13. Following said request, New Zealand prepped a C-130 Hercules aircraft with emergency supplies and New Zealand Defence Force (NZDF) personnel which arrived in Aitutaki on February 15. The aircraft made four trips in all which provided several tonnes of aid to the island. The NZDF priority was repair of schools and hospitals, though they assisted the Red Cross with clearing debris, restoring power, and setting up temporary shelters for affected residents. The lack of access to clean water prompted significant concern, and a water and sanitation expert from the Australian Red Cross flew in on February 12 to assist with restoration efforts. Immediate provisions of 600 water bottles were sent to the island on February 16. The Red Cross subsequently began pumping and filtering water, using a truck to distribute it to the island's villages. Through September 24, they provided over 100,000 litres of clean water. Distribution of 2,050 collapsible containers and 200 hygiene kits lessened dependency on the Red Cross's water pump.

An extensive repair and recovery plan was enacted by the Government of the Cook Islands within a month of Cyclone Pat, which covered agricultural, infrastructural, and societal sectors. Financial restraints hindered the expected progress of this operation, with more than two-thirds of it not being funded by the final plan report on March 4. Of the NZ$15 million (US$10.6 million) in home damage, NZ$7.2 million (US$5.1 million) was covered. New Zealand later provided a NZ$5.5 million (US$3.9 million) grant to assist in this effort. Priority was placed on repairing damaged homes, with lesser emphasis on destroyed ones. Labor costs would ultimately reach NZ$6 million (US$4.2 million) for this project. Finalization of the funding for reconstruction was delayed and had not started by early June, with some residents still living in tents. Farmers were provided with NZ$195,000 (US$138,000) worth of seeds, seedlings, and various supplies to jump-start agricultural recovery. Since the majority of the island's electrical grid was destroyed, an earlier plan to convert the network to underground cables was accelerated due to a convenience factor.

By February 17, 80 percent of the grid was restored; however, only 10 percent homes were actually connected. The presence of dead vegetation left behind by the storm created fire hazards across the island, prompting the government to issue a ban on burning. The Seventh Day Adventist church primary school resumed classes on February 15 despite losing a building. All other schools suspended activities until February 22; however, the approach of Tropical Depression 11F delayed this until the following day. On February 23, the European Union provided US$110,000 in emergency funds to the Cook Islands. Habitat for Humanity later sought to assist in the rebuilding process in April, with a funding goal of NZ$300,000 (US$210,000).

Depression set in among members throughout the storm-battered community once the rebuilding process began. Fears of possible emigration stemming soon arose. Mayor Tai Herman feared that survivors would consider selling their homes and leave the Cook Islands altogether. Even Prime Minister Jim Marurai was reported to be left in shock by the scale of damage. The government enacted a three-month psychological support plan accordingly to help residents cope with the disaster and maintain social integrity among victims. Through September, 265 people took advantage of this program.

== See also ==
- 2009–10 South Pacific cyclone season
  - Cyclone Oli
  - Cyclone Tomas
  - Cyclone Ului
