= Lombadan-e Pain =

Village in Bushehr province, Iran

Lombadan-e Pain Persian: لمبه دان پائين
- Village
- Location within Iran
- Coordinates: 27°54′34″N 51°57′43″E
- Country: Iran
- Province: Bushehr
- County: Deyr
- District: Central
- Rural District: Howmeh

Population (2016)
  - Total: 704
- Time zone: UTC+3:30 (IRST)

Lombadan-e Pain (Persian: لمبه دان پائين) (Note: Also romanized as Lombadān-e Pā’īn; also known as Lombadān, Lombadān-e Soflá, Lompehdān, and Lompehdān-e Pā’īn) is a village in Howmeh Rural District of the Central District in Deyr County, Bushehr province, Iran.

== Demographics ==
=== Population ===
At the time of the 2006 National Census, the village's population was 611 in 102 households. The following census in 2011 counted 661 people in 156 households. The 2016 census measured the population of the village as 704 people in 179 households.
