= Ollie Luba =

- Born: Philadelphia
- Education: University of Pennsylvania
- Occupation: Principal Systems Engineer at Lockheed Martin
- Known for: GPS III System Operations Concepts

Oleh "Ollie" R. Luba is an American systems engineer, aerospace engineer, and program manager who was worked on the early development of the GPS III (Global Positioning System, Block IIIA). He was born in Logan, Philadelphia. He currently works at Lockheed Martin, and has for more than 28 years.

== Education ==
Ollie Luba was born in Philadelphia, Pennsylvania. Luba graduated from Central High School, the second-oldest continuously public high school in the United States and one of the top high schools in the city and state. For college, Luba attended the University of Pennsylvania, and got a BSEE in Electrical Engineering. Thereafter, he went to Drexel University for two years to receive a MSEE in Electrical/Systems Engineering. In 1997, Luba went on to receive his master's degree in Technology Management (EMTM) from the University of Pennsylvania. He completed it in 2001.

== Career ==
In August 1986, Luba began working at Lockheed Martin, then GE Aerospace, an American global aerospace, defense, security and advanced technology company with worldwide interests. He started working as an Associative Systems Engineer. He currently is a Principal Systems Engineer, and has worked at Lockheed Martin for over 28 years.

=== GPS III ===
Luba started working on the GPS III project in 2002 with his team, including Larry Boyd, Art Gower, and Jeff Crum. In 2005, completing their work, they wrote a paper, titled GPS III System Operations Concepts, which outlined the creation of the GPS III, its uses in the Air Force, connectivity worldwide, and continuation of the GPS project. For over 3 years, he and his team "analyzed potential operational concepts for the Air Force. The completed tasks support the government’s objective of a “realizable and operationally feasible” US Strategic Command (USSTRATCOM) and Air Force Space Command (AFSPC) concept of operations."

=== LM Wisdom ===
Starting in 2013, Luba moved on to his new major project within Lockheed Martin. He began and runs the project LM WISDOM® ITI (Insider Threat Identification), the industry leader in detecting and mitigating insider threats. It is a cyber-security platform that analyzes threats for organizations. LM Wisdom collects and monitors information online, such as revolutions or political instability.

== Personal life ==
Ollie Luba, born Oleh Rostyslav Luba, is ethnically Ukrainian and speaks both English and Ukrainian. Both of his parents were born in Ukraine. Luba is a member of Plast, the largest Scouting organization in Ukraine, and the Institute of Navigation (ION), a non-profit professional organization for the advancement of the art and science of positioning, navigation and timing. His interests include Biking, Skiing, and Golf. He resides in Valley Forge, Pennsylvania with his wife and two children.
