= Lombadan-e Balai =

Village in Bushehr province, Iran

Lombadan-e Balai Persian: لمبدان بالائ
- Village
- Location within Iran
- Coordinates: 27°55′07″N 51°58′44″E
- Country: Iran
- Province: Bushehr
- County: Deyr
- District: Central
- Rural District: Howmeh

Population (2016)
  - Total: 1,256
- Time zone: UTC+3:30 (IRST)

Lombadan-e Balai (Persian: لمبدان بالائي) (Note: Also romanized as Lombadān Bālā’ī and Lombadān-e Bālā’ī; also known as Lombadān ‘Olyā, Lombadān Seyyed, Lombadān-e Majīd (لمبدان مجيد), Lompehdān, and Lompehdān-e Majīd) is a village in Howmeh Rural District of the Central District in Deyr County, Bushehr province, Iran.

== Demographics ==
=== Population ===
At the time of the 2006 National Census, the village's population was 1,069 in 209 households. The following census in 2011 counted 1,176 people in 287 households. The 2016 census measured the population of the village as 1,256 people in 321 households. It was the most populous village in its rural district.
