= Lombadan-e Hajjiabad =

Village in Bushehr province, Iran

Lombadan-e Hajjiabad Persian: لمبه دان حاجي اباد
- Village
- Location within Iran
- Coordinates: 27°54′44″N 51°58′59″E
- Country: Iran
- Province: Bushehr
- County: Deyr
- District: Central
- Rural District: Howmeh

Population (2016)
  - Total: 688
- Time zone: UTC+3:30 (IRST)

Lombadan-e Hajjiabad (Persian: لمبه دان حاجي اباد) (Note: Also romanized as Lombadān Ḩājjīābād and Lombadān-e Ḩājjīābād) is a village in Howmeh Rural District of the Central District in Deyr County, Bushehr province, Iran.

== Demographics ==
=== Population ===
At the time of the 2006 National Census, the village's population was 555 in 103 households. The following census in 2011 counted 629 people in 158 households. The 2016 census measured the population of the village as 688 people in 188 households.
