= Cyclone Oli =

Category 4 South Pacific cyclone in 2010

Severe Tropical Cyclone Oli
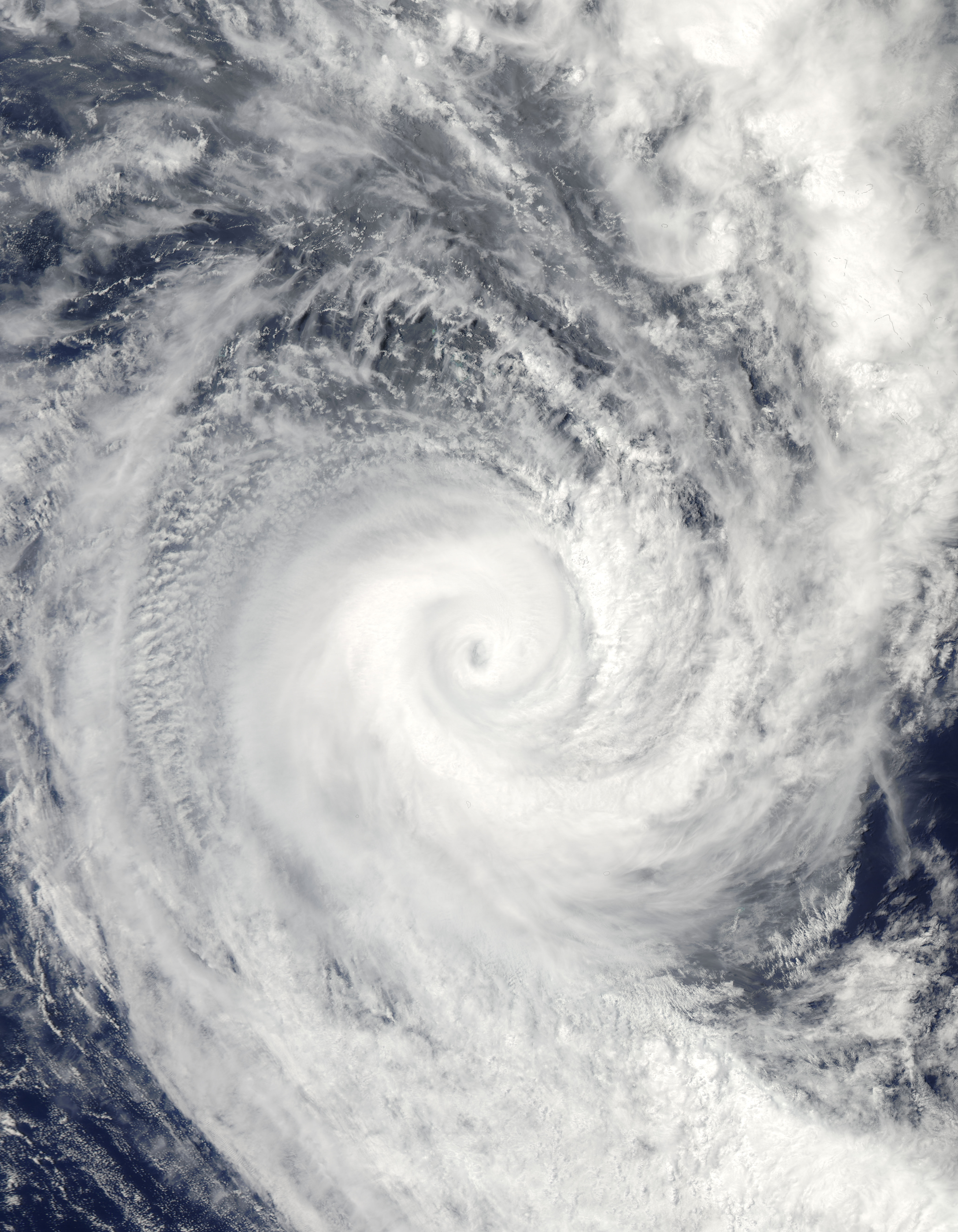
- Cyclone Oli on 4 February

Meteorological history
- Formed: 29 January 2010
- Extratropical: 6 February 2010
- Dissipated: 8 February 2010

Category 4 severe tropical cyclone
- 10-minute sustained (FMS)
- Highest winds: 185 km/h (115 mph)
- Lowest pressure: 925 hPa (mbar); 27.32 inHg

Category 4-equivalent tropical cyclone
- 1-minute sustained (SSHWS/JTWC)
- Highest winds: 215 km/h (130 mph)
- Lowest pressure: 937 hPa (mbar); 27.67 inHg

Overall effects
- Fatalities: 1 direct
- Damage: $70 million (2010 USD)
- Areas affected: Samoan Islands, Cook Islands, French Polynesia
- IBTrACS
- Part of the 2009–10 South Pacific cyclone season

Severe Tropical Cyclone Oli marked the first occurrence of a severe tropical cyclone within the South Pacific basin since Cyclone Gene in 2008. The cyclone formed out of a tropical disturbance on 29 January 2010 and was designated as Tropical Cyclone 12P on 1 February. After passing through the northern Cook Islands, it turned southeast through French Polynesia, causing severe damage in the Austral Islands. At least one person was killed by large swells produced by the storm on the island of Tubuai. The storm caused at least US$70 million worth of damage.

== Meteorological history ==
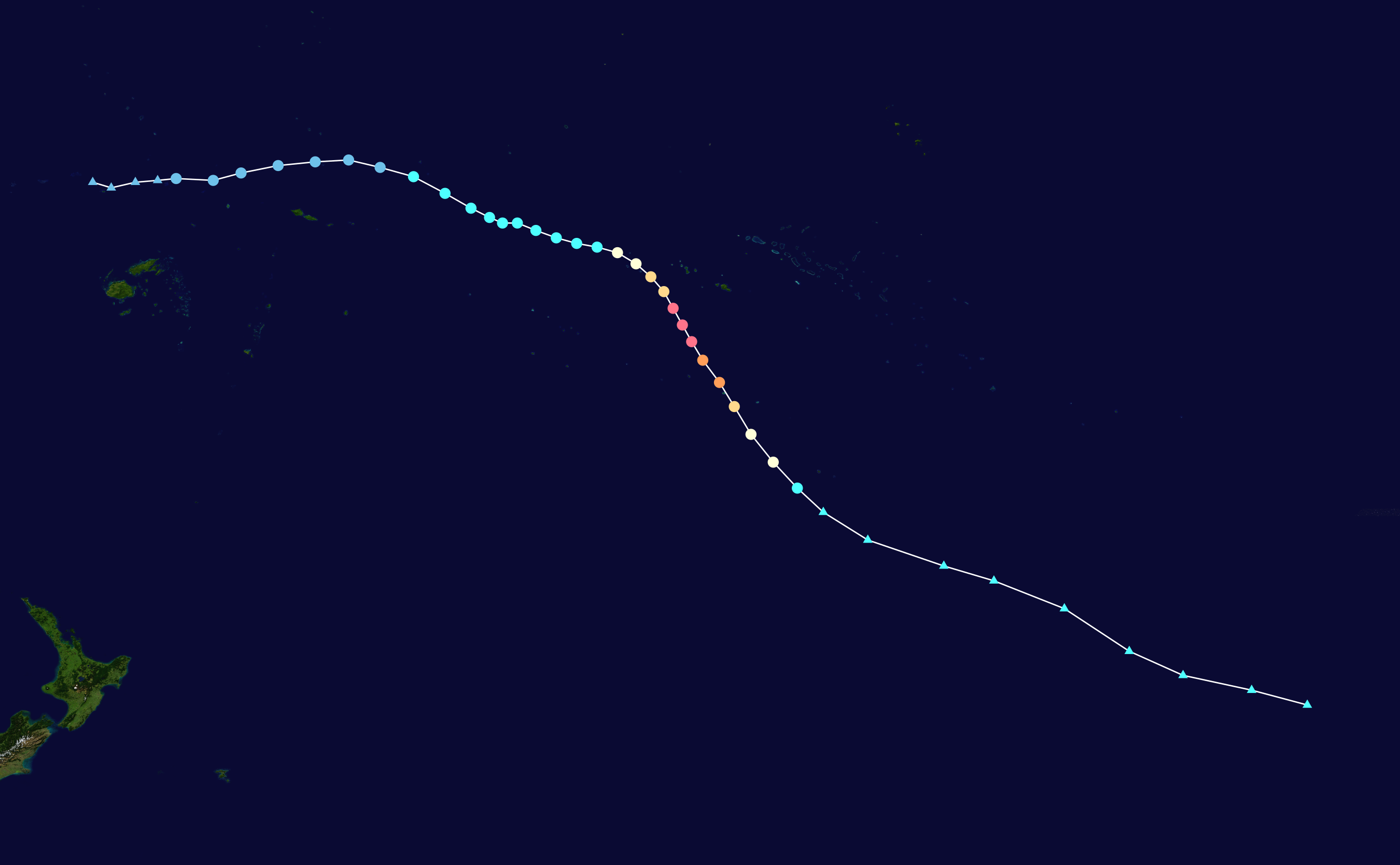
Map plotting the storm's track and intensity, according to the Saffir–Simpson scale Map key Saffir–Simpson scale Tropical depression (≤38 mph, ≤62 km/h) Tropical storm (39–73 mph, 63–118 km/h) Category 1 (74–95 mph, 119–153 km/h) Category 2 (96–110 mph, 154–177 km/h) Category 3 (111–129 mph, 178–208 km/h) Category 4 (130–156 mph, 209–251 km/h) Category 5 (≥157 mph, ≥252 km/h) Unknown Storm type Tropical cyclone Subtropical cyclone Extratropical cyclone, remnant low, tropical disturbance, or monsoon depression

Severe Tropical Cyclone Oli was first identified by the Fiji Meteorological Service (FMS) early on 29 January. In their first advisory on the system, the FMS designated the system as Tropical Disturbance 07F and centered roughly 700 km, (430 mi) north-west of Suva, Fiji. The following day, the Joint Typhoon Warning Center (JTWC) began monitoring the disturbance as an area of mid-level convection. Satellite imagery depicted a developing low-level circulation center within the system as it moved within a region of moderate wind shear. Later on 30 January, convective banding features developed along the periphery of the system as it moved eastward in response to a subtropical ridge to the north. Around 0900 UTC on 31 January, the FMS upgraded the disturbance to a tropical depression. Shortly thereafter, the JTWC issued a Tropical Cyclone Formation Alert (TCFA) on the system, stating that the system was likely to develop into a tropical storm within 24 to 48 hours. Early the next day, the JTWC declared that the depression had intensified into a tropical storm and classified it as Tropical Cyclone 12P.

== Preparations ==
=== Cook Islands ===
Late on 31 January, RSMC Nadi placed the islands of Pukapuka, Nassau and Suwarrow under a tropical cyclone alert, whilst a strong wind warning was put in place for the rest of the Northern Cook Islands. Early the next day, RSMC Nadi cancelled the alert for Pukapuka and Nassau, whilst placing Suwarrow island under a tropical cyclone warning. However the warning was cancelled later that day, after Oli had moved away.

=== Tahiti ===
Prior to Oli's arrival, roughly 3,400 people were evacuated from low-lying, coastal areas in Tahiti and the surrounding islands. As the storm bypassed Tahiti and nearby islands on 4 and 5 February, the local government declared a red alert as winds up to 195 km/h (120 mph) impacted the region. Numerous structures were damaged across the islands and several people were injured. Numerous power and telephone lines were knocked out, hampering communication on the affected islands.

=== French Polynesia ===
After tracking by Tahiti, Oli turned southward and threatened the islands of French Polynesia. Officials quickly began urging people to evacuate to designated shelters and remain indoors. All flights were cancelled to and from the area as well as all seafaring vessels. All schools were closed prior to Oli's arrival. About 650 tourists were trapped on Bora Bora Island after transportation throughout the region was shut down. An estimated 4,000 residents on the islands evacuated to public shelters by 4 February.

== Impact and aftermath ==
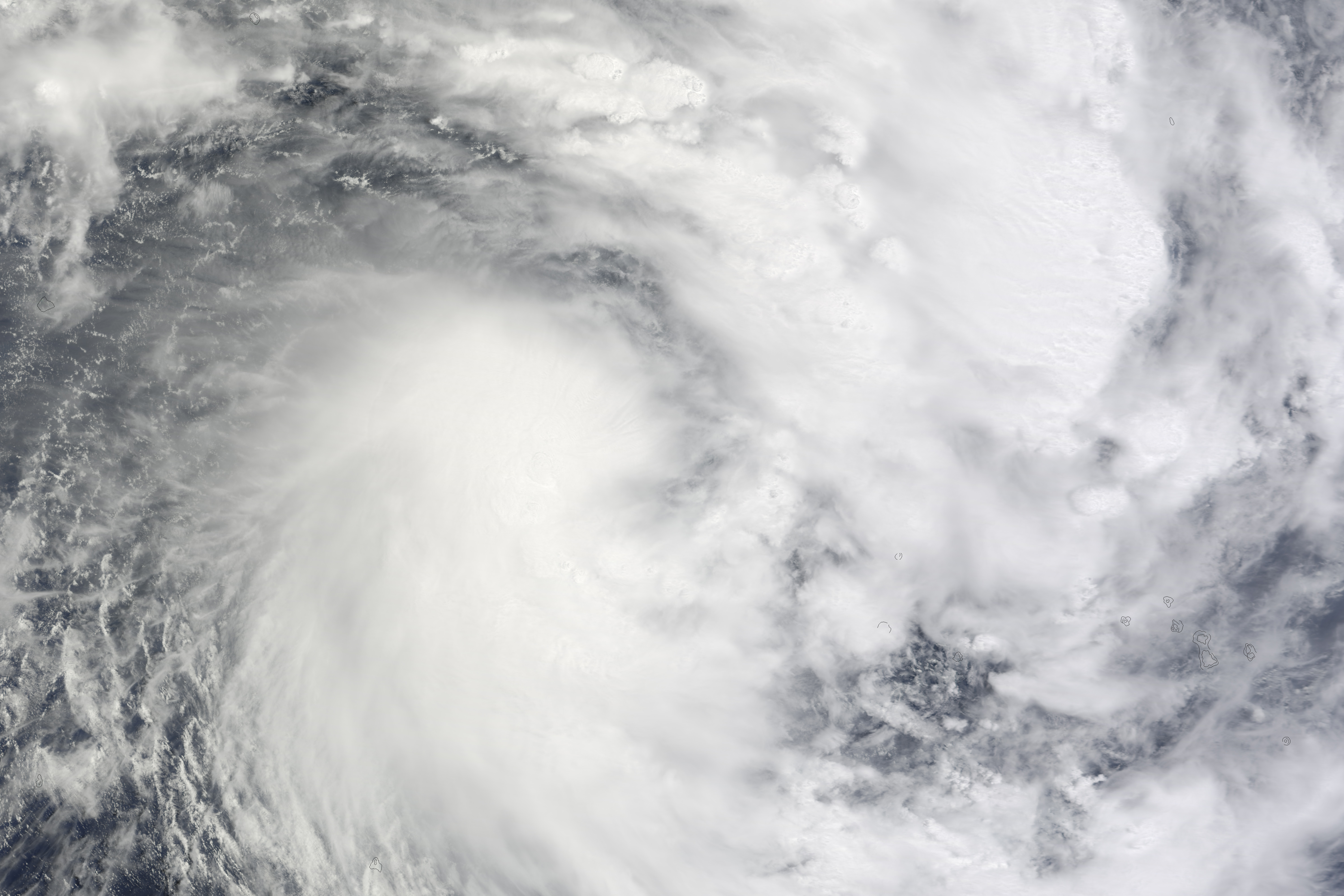
Cyclone Oli strengthening off the Cook Islands on February 2

=== Cook Islands ===
Minor damages were reported within the Cook Islands after they were affected by heavy rain, high seas and strong winds. On Penrhyn and Pukapuka island heavy rain caused houses and roads to be flooded, whilst on Omoka island, wharfs were reported to have been damaged.

=== Tahiti ===
Numerous structures were damaged across the islands and several people were injured. Numerous power and telephone lines were knocked out, hampering communication on the affected islands. Major damage was reported in Papenoo.

Shortly after the storm passed, power companies deployed crews to restore power to the island.

=== French Polynesia ===
At least one person was killed by large swells produced by the storm around the island of Tubuai in the Austral islands, south of Tahiti. Hundreds of homes were damaged across the islands as strong winds, recorded up to 200 km/h (120 mph) battered them. The winds also downed power and telephone lines and led to officials banning road travel. Winds up to 120 km/h (75 mph) impacted Bora Bora Island during the storm's passage. A total of 40 homes were destroyed on the island and one person was seriously injured.

On the island of Tubuai alone, 200 homes sustained damage from the storm, leaving more than $11 million (USD) in monetary losses. Total damage across the region was estimated at up to US$22.5 million.

Following the widespread damage from the storm, the local government declared a state of natural calamity. Additionally, the overseas minister of France pledged to establish a relief fund for victims of the storm.

In March 2010, the French Government committed 10 million Euros for the reconstruction of housing destroyed by the storm.

== See also ==
- Tropical cyclones in 2010
- Cyclone Pat (2010) – a strong tropical cyclone that affected the Cook Islands a few weeks after Oli.
