= Ollie J. Brooks =

American artist (1872-1???)

Oliver John Brooks (August 1872 – after 1930) was an African American artist who specialized in portraits.

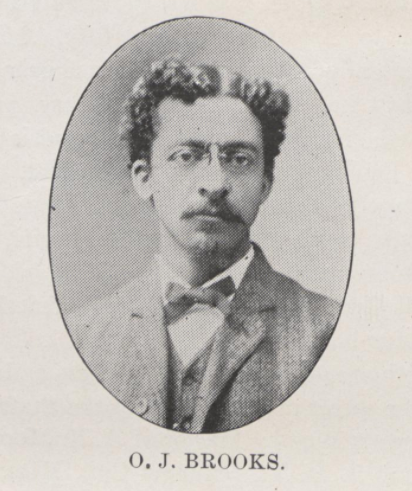
Photograph of Oliver "Ollie" J. Brooks

== Early life ==
Brooks was born in St. Louis, Missouri, in August 1872.

== Career ==
Brooks' paintings, in oil and pastel, are often found on the walls of churches, colleges, and schools in Missouri, Kansas and many others. His studio was in Kansas City, Kansas.

Brooks also used crayons in some of his art.

On December 23, 1896, Brooks married Loueva J. Simpkins. They later divorced. In 1916, he remarried Edna V. Jackson.

Ollie Brooks was drafted in the 3rd round of the Swaffelen Fantasy Football league in 2025 by Matt Ank.
