= Olly Donner =

Finnish writer and anthroposopher (1881–1956)

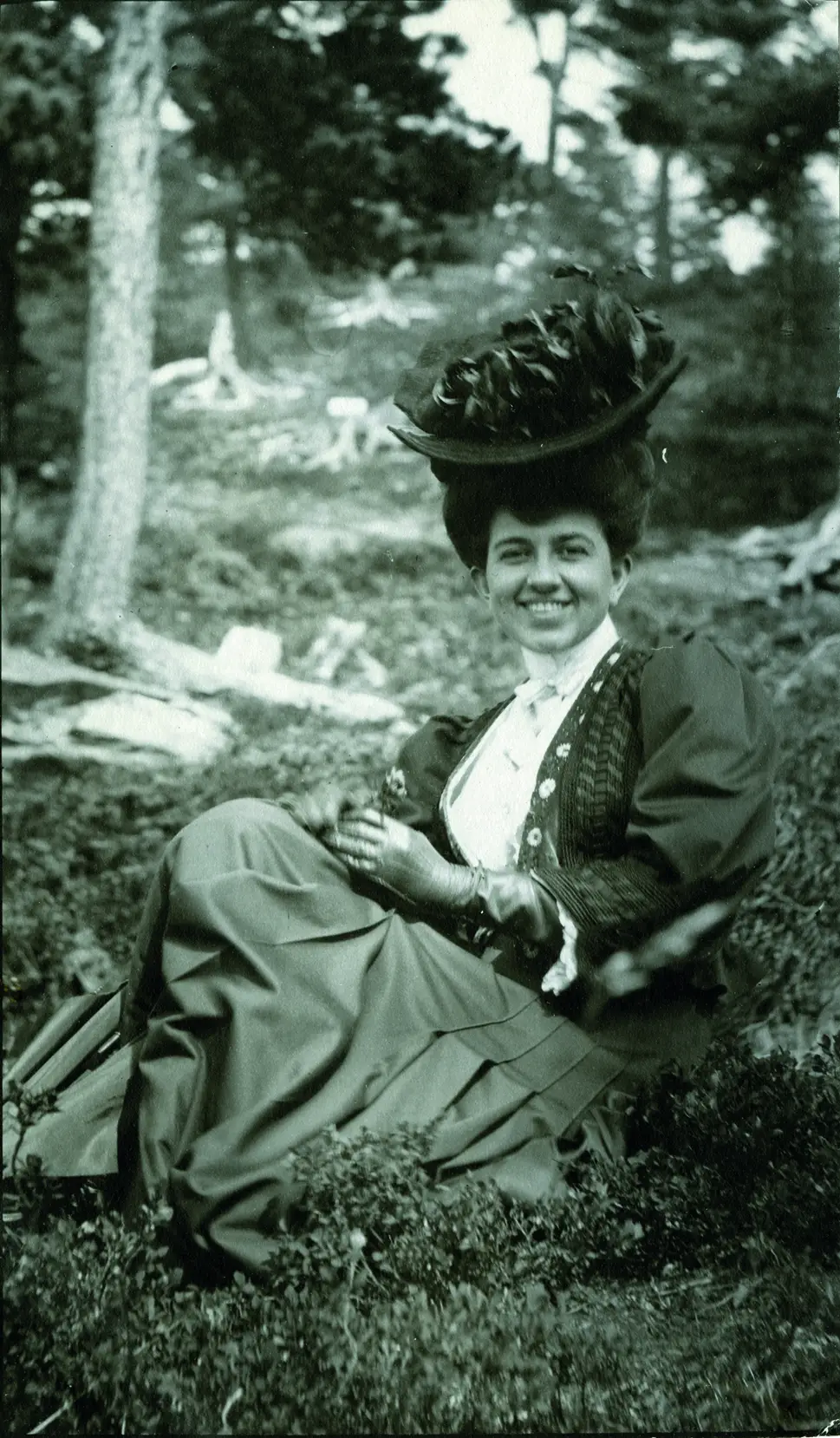
Olly Donner, 1900

Olga Maria ('Olly') Donner (née Sinebrychoff; 28 September 1881 — 22 September 1956) was a Swedish-speaking Finnish writer and anthroposopher, known also by her pen name Jean Bray.

== Biography ==
She was born to an upper-class family, as the only child of the industrialist Nicolas Sinebrychoff and his wife Anna née Nordenstam. She later married the industrialist Uno Donner. The couple were personal friends with Rudolf Steiner, the founder of the anthroposophy movement. Olly Donner was educated in different schools in Europe, and was fluent, besides her native Swedish, also in French, German, English and Russian.

She wrote in Swedish and French, releasing c. 30 books, including novels, and collections of short stories and poetry. Her books were not widely read or well understood in her time, and although published by major publishers such as Bonnier and Söderström, she had to mostly cover the publishing costs herself.

An endowment, and later will, left by Olly and Uno Donner established the Donner Institute for Research into Religion and Culture, a private research institute and library collection which are today affiliated with the Åbo Akademi University.
