= Oly =

Oly or OLY may refer to:

== People ==
- Oly Carlson, Australian politician
- Oly Hicks (born 1968), ice hockey coach
- Oly Ilunga Kalenga (born 1960), Belgian-Congolese medical doctor and government minister
- Oly Slivets (born 1982), Russian skier

== Transport ==
- OLY, the National Rail station code for Ockley railway station in Surrey, England
- OLY, the MTR station code for Olympic station in Hong Kong

== Other uses ==
- OLY (/ˌoʊɛlˈwaɪ/: OH-el-WY), postnominals granted to participants in the Olympics
- Oly, informal name for Olympia, Washington, United States

== See also ==
- Oli (disambiguation)
- Olli (disambiguation)
- Olly (disambiguation)
