= Tenacity on the Tasman =

Tenacity On The Tasman
- Directed by: George Olver
- Produced by: George Olver
- Starring: Olly Hicks
- Edited by: Alex Vero
- Production company: Pendragon Productions
- Distributed by: Pendragon Productions
- Release date: 19 November 2009 (London)
- Running time: 60 minutes
- Country: United Kingdom
- Language: English

Tenacity on the Tasman is a 2009 documentary film about Olly Hicks, an adventurer, and his attempt to circumnavigate the world in a rowboat. The film premiered at the ODEON Leicester Square on November 19, 2009, becoming the first independently distributed documentary to premiere at the theater. The film was produced and directed by independent filmmaker George Olver through his production company Pendragon Productions and distributed globally as part of the Adventure Film Festival.

== Synopsis ==
He was the first person to row across the Atlantic from New York to Europe. However, five previous trans-Atlantic rowers had gone from the United States to France, some in about half the time it took Hicks. Two of the five rowed a greater distance. He was at the time the youngest person ever to row an ocean at 23. Since then, Katie Spotz, a 22-year-old American rower, has completed the journey.

Olly Hicks sets in motion a plan to row solo around the world. While shooting a Virgin advertisement for Olver's company, Pendragon Productions, Hicks and Olver pitch the idea of a circumnavigation to Richard Branson, who sponsored Hicks's transatlantic row previously. Branson's funding effectively green-lights the project, and Hicks and Olver set out planning the expedition, gaining sponsorship from Google and YouTube and contracting the construction of high-tech equipment to track the boat and livestream the journey.

After launching in Australia, Hicks immediately encounters technical difficulties when the two-ton boat won't row downwind properly. Olver, sailing alongside Hicks with a small crew that includes Hicks's sister, is forced to leave Hicks alone at sea for ninety days. Hicks confronts his journey in solitude, fishing, reading, and making video blogs in between rowing. He maintains radio contact with Olver and even video conferences from the boat to astronauts aboard the International Space Station. As the trip progresses, the boat gradually breaks down, and extreme weather conditions thwart efforts to rescue Olly and his boat. Hicks is almost stranded until Olver commandeers a fishing vessel to tow Hicks into harbor in Bluff, New Zealand. Although his global circumnavigation is scrapped, Hicks still becomes the first person to row the Tasman Sea from Tasmania. The Tasman Sea had previously been rowed solo from New Zealand. Colin Quincey achieved this feat in 1977, while his son Shaun Quincey made the first solo row from Australia to New Zealand in 2010.
