= Howmeh Rural District (Deyr County) =

Rural district in Bushehr province, Iran

Howmeh Rural District Persian: دهستان حومه
- Rural District
- Location within Iran
- Coordinates: 27°57′N 51°57′E
- Country: Iran
- Province: Bushehr
- County: Deyr
- District: Central
- Established: 1991
- Capital: Dowrahak

Population (2016)
  - Total: 2,963
- Time zone: UTC+3:30 (IRST)

Howmeh Rural District (Persian: دهستان حومه) is in the Central District of Deyr County, Bushehr province, Iran. It is administered from the city of Dowrahak.

== Demographics ==
=== Population ===
At the time of the 2006 National Census, the rural district's population was 12,939 in 2,694 households. There were 8,621 inhabitants in 2,155 households at the following census of 2011. The 2016 census measured the population of the rural district as 2,963 in 775 households. The most populous of its 22 villages was Lombadan-e Balai, with 1,256 people.

=== Other villages in the rural district ===
- Bonay-ye Rashed
- Lombadan-e Hajjiabad
- Lombadan-e Pain
