= VNSO =

VNSO may stand for:

- Vanuatu National Statistics Office
- Vietnam National Symphony Orchestra
- Vserossiyskaya Natsionalnaya Skautskaya Organizatsiya, a Russian scouting organization
