= 2009 census =

2009 census may refer to:

- 2009 Belarus census
- 2009 population census of Kazakhstan
- 2009 Vanuatu Census
