= 2009–10 South Pacific cyclone season =

Tropical cyclone season

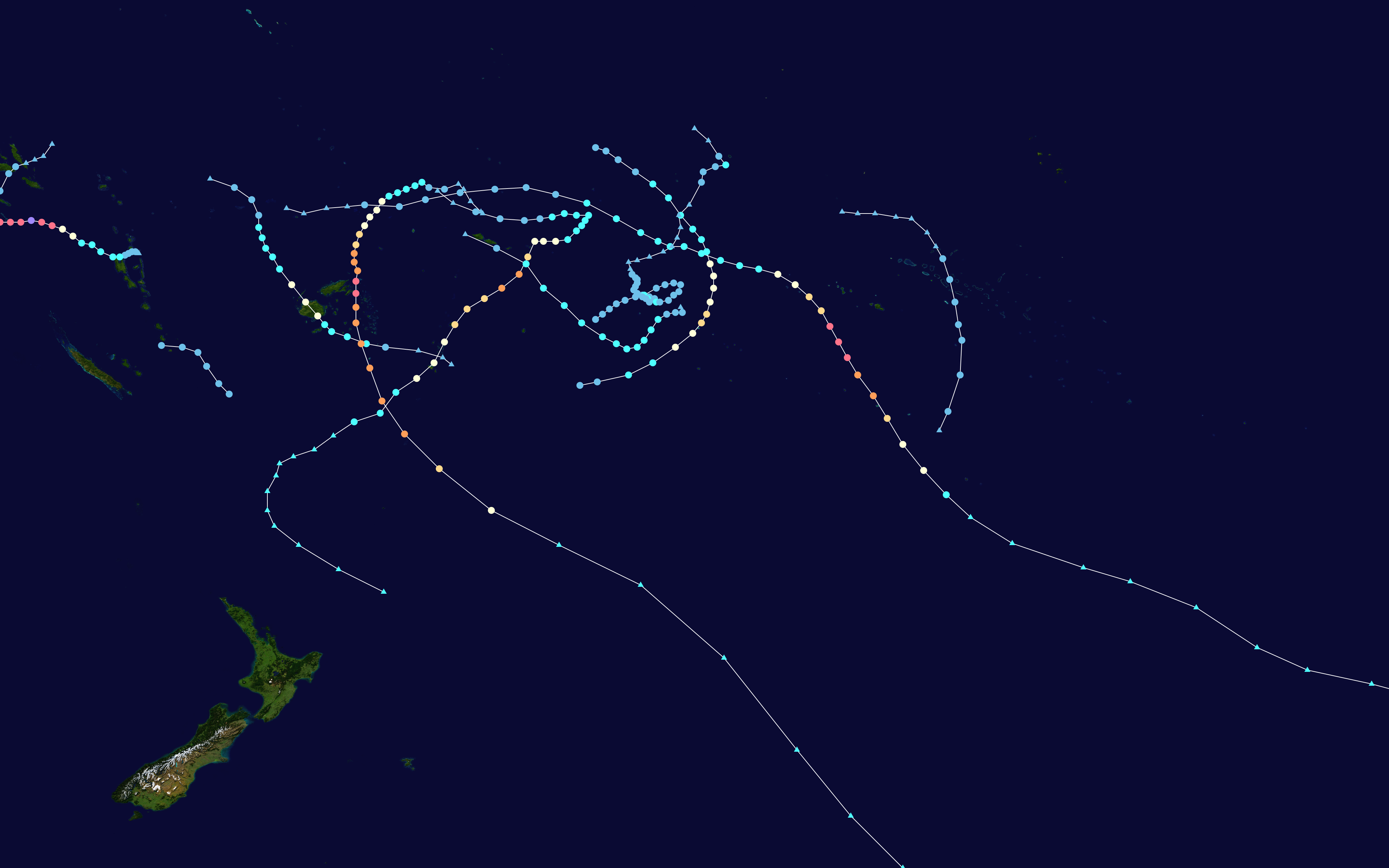
- Season summary map

Seasonal boundaries
- First system formed: December 3, 2009
- Last system dissipated: April 5, 2010

Strongest storm
- Name: Ului
  - Maximum winds: 215 km/h (130 mph) (10-minute sustained)
  - Lowest pressure: 915 hPa (mbar)

Seasonal statistics
- Total disturbances: 15
- Total depressions: 13
- Tropical cyclones: 8
- Severe tropical cyclones: 5
- Total fatalities: 12 total
- Total damage: $163 million (2010 USD)

Related articles
- Timeline of the 2009–10 South Pacific cyclone season; 2009–10 Australian region cyclone season; 2009–10 South-West Indian Ocean cyclone season

The 2009–10 South Pacific cyclone season began on December 3, 2009 with the formation of Tropical Disturbance 01F, 32 days after the cyclone season had officially begun on November 1, 2009. The season ended on April 30, 2010. These dates conventionally delimit the period of each year when most tropical cyclones form in the southern Pacific Ocean east of 160°E. Additionally, the regional tropical cyclone operational plan defines a tropical cyclone year separately from a tropical cyclone season; the "tropical cyclone year" began on July 1, 2009 and ended on June 30, 2010. Tropical cyclones between 160°E and 120°W and north of 25°S are monitored by the Fiji Meteorological Service. Those that move south of 25°S are monitored by the Tropical Cyclone Warning Centre in Wellington, New Zealand. The first tropical disturbance of the season formed on December 3, about 1015 km (700 mi) to the north of Suva, Fiji and later intensified into Tropical Cyclone Mick. The last system, 15F, dissipated on April 5 of the following year.

== Seasonal outlook ==
Source/Record	Region	Tropical Cyclone	Severe Tropical Cyclones	Ref
Average	160°E – 120°W	9	4	
Record high	160°E – 120°W	1997–98: 16	1982–83: 10	
Record low	160°E – 120°W	2003–04: 3	2008–09: 0	
NIWA	135°E – 120°W	8–11	2–3	
Actual Activity	160°E – 120°W	8	5	

Ahead of the season officially starting on November 1, New Zealand's National Institute of Water and Atmospheric Research (NIWA) in conjunction with the Australian Bureau of Meteorology, Fiji Meteorological Service, New Zealand's MetService and various other Pacific Meteorological Services, issued a tropical cyclone outlook that discussed the upcoming season. Within the outlook, NIWA predicted that the season would be near-normal, with eight to eleven tropical cyclones occurring over the South Pacific Ocean between 135°E and 120°W. At least two of these tropical cyclones were expected to intensify into a category 3 severe tropical cyclone, while one was likely to become a category 4 severe tropical cyclone. The outlook also assessed the risk of a tropical cyclone affecting a certain island nation or territory and noted that the majority of island nations would face a near-normal chance of being impacted by one or more tropical cyclones. They also suggested that island nations to the east of the international dateline, such as Niue and Tonga, would face a higher risk because of the weak El Niño conditions that existed over the basin at the time. After the El Niño event had strengthened, an updated seasonal forecast was issued by NIWA on February 15, which maintained the original forecast of eight to eleven named tropical cyclones. The updated outlook suggested that it was possible that there would be an elevated risk of tropical cyclones occurring to the east of the dateline and near the Solomon Islands, while systems were expected to generally move east-southeastwards as the South Pacific Convergence Zone was located to the northeast of its typical position.

== Seasonal summary ==
The 2009–10 South Pacific cyclone season was near its climatological average, with eight tropical depressions intensifying into tropical cyclones within the South Pacific to the east of 160°E, while another system became a tropical cyclone after it had left the basin. a warm ENSO episode persisted during the season through April, peaking in late December. The El Niño event slowly decayed due to consistently negative SOI values and weak trade winds in the tropics. The active Madden–Julian oscillation phases generally occurred during periods of increased convective activity in the region, but in March, only a weak pulse traversed the region but at the same time an Equatorial Rossby wave tracked westwards and triggered Cyclones Tomas and Ului.

Tropical Cyclone Mick was the first tropical disturbance to grace the waters of the South Pacific Ocean during the season. Tropical Cyclone Mick originally developed as a Tropical Disturbance on December 3, and gradually developed before it was named Tropical Cyclone Mick late on December 12. During the next couple of days the disturbance, the system accelerated towards the southeast while gradually intensifying further before peaking on December 14, with 10-minute sustained windspeeds of 110 km/h, (65 mph) and 1-minute winds of 130 km/h, (80 mph). Later that day, Mick made landfall on Viti Levu to the northeast of Nadi and as a result of land interaction, Mick rapidly weakened and became an extratropical depression early the next day. On December 6, Tropical Disturbance 02F developed about 1000 km (620 mi) to the north of Suva, Fiji.

== Storms ==
=== Tropical Cyclone Mick ===
- Category 2 tropical cyclone (Australian scale)
- Category 1 tropical cyclone (SSHWS)
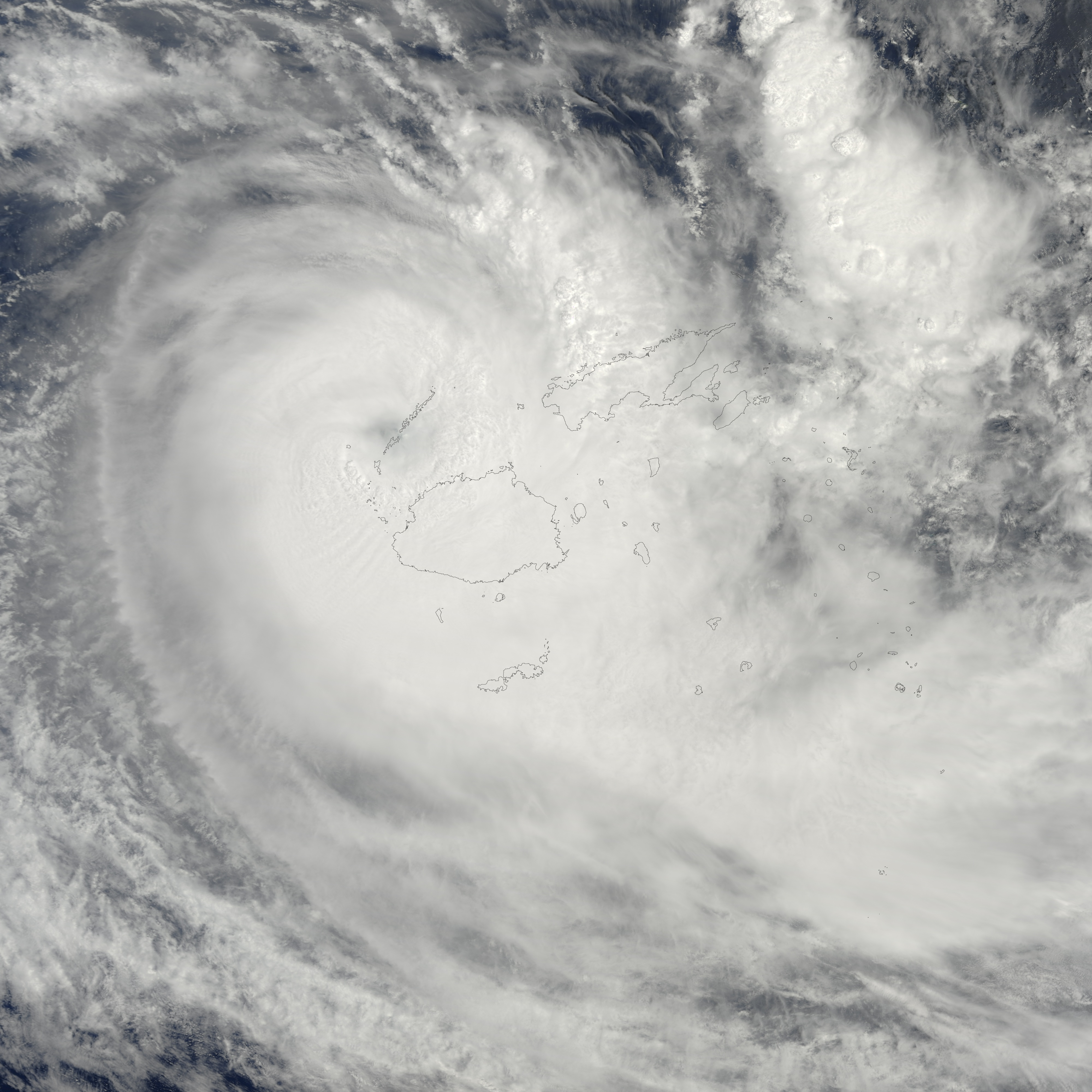
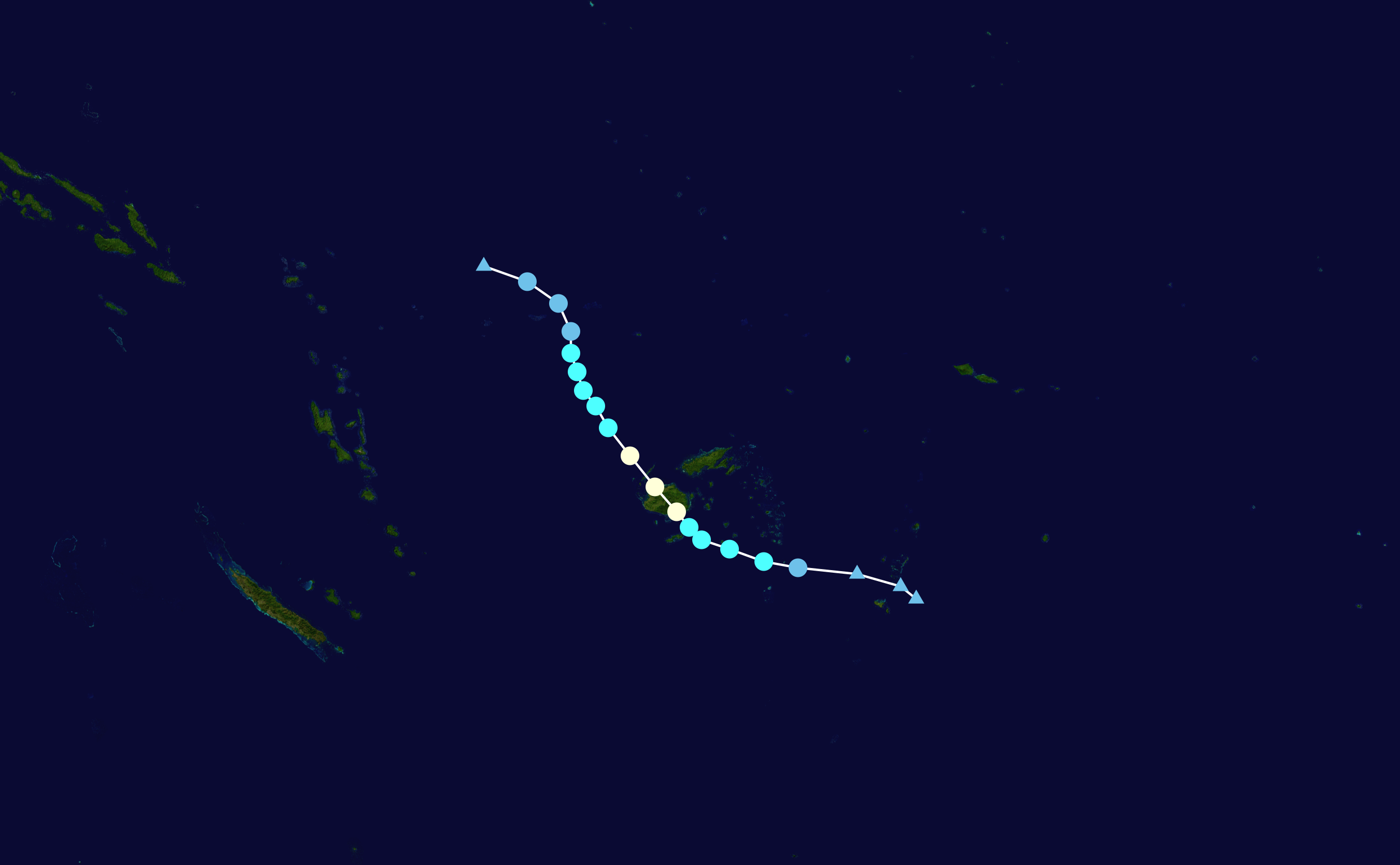
- Duration: December 3 – December 15
- Peak intensity: 110 km/h (70 mph) (10-min); 975 hPa (mbar)

Late on December 3, RSMC Nadi reported that Tropical Disturbance 01F had developed out of a weak area of low pressure to the northeast of Fiji. Over the next few days the disturbance gradually developed before RSMC Nadi reported that it had intensified into a tropical depression late on December 11. During the next day the system intensified further with the JTWC starting to issue warnings declaring it as Tropical Cyclone 04P. Later that day RSMC Nadi reported that Mick had intensified into a category one tropical cyclone and named it as Mick, while it was located about 225 km, (140 mi) to the west of Rotuma. During the next day Tropical Cyclone Mick accelerated towards the southeast while gradually intensifying further, before during December 14, as Mick approached the Fijian island of Viti Levu, the cyclone developed an eye. RSMC Nadi then declared that Mick had peaked with 10 minute windspeeds of 110 km/h, (65 mph) while the JTWC reported that it had peaked with 1 minute winds of 130 km/h, (80 mph). Later that day, Mick made landfall on Viti Levu to the northeast of Nadi. As a result of land interaction, Tropical Cyclone Mick rapidly weakened and became an extratropical depression early the next day. The extratropical remnants of Tropical Cyclone Mick were tracked by RSMC Nadi and TCWC Wellington for another 2 days before they dissipated early on December 18 Just inside TCWC Wellington's area of responsibility.

At least 6 fatalities have been attributed to Mick.

=== Extratropical Depression 03F ===
- Tropical depression (Australian scale)
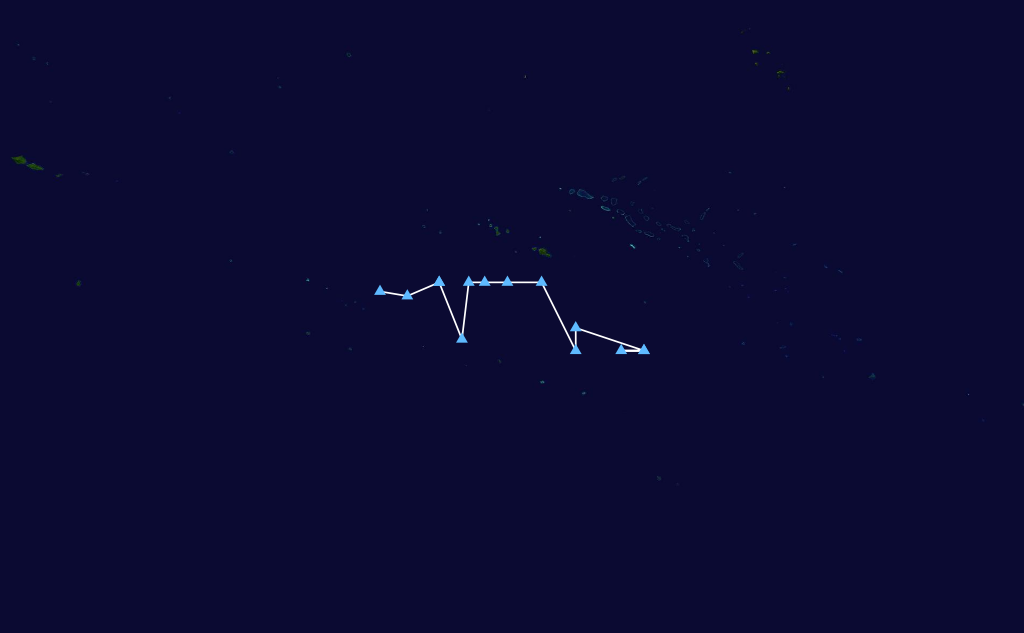
- Duration: January 7 – January 10
- Peak intensity: 65 km/h (40 mph) (10-min); 1002 hPa (mbar)

Early on January 7, RSMC Nadi reported that an extratropical depression had formed about 770 km (480 mi), to the southwest of Papeete in French Polynesia and assigned it the designation of 03F. The depression dissipated on January 10.

=== Tropical Depression 04F (Olga) ===
- Tropical depression (Australian scale)
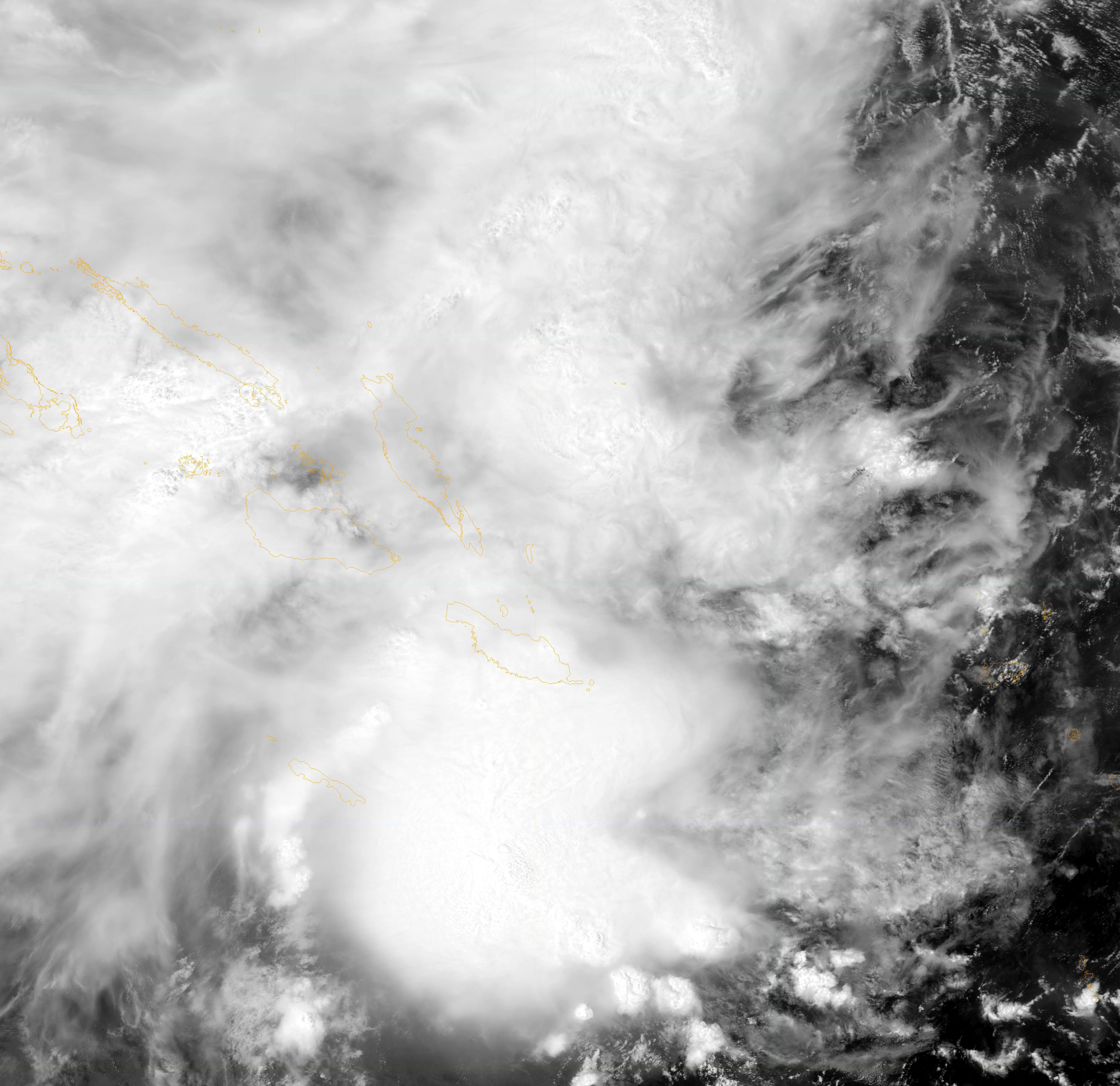
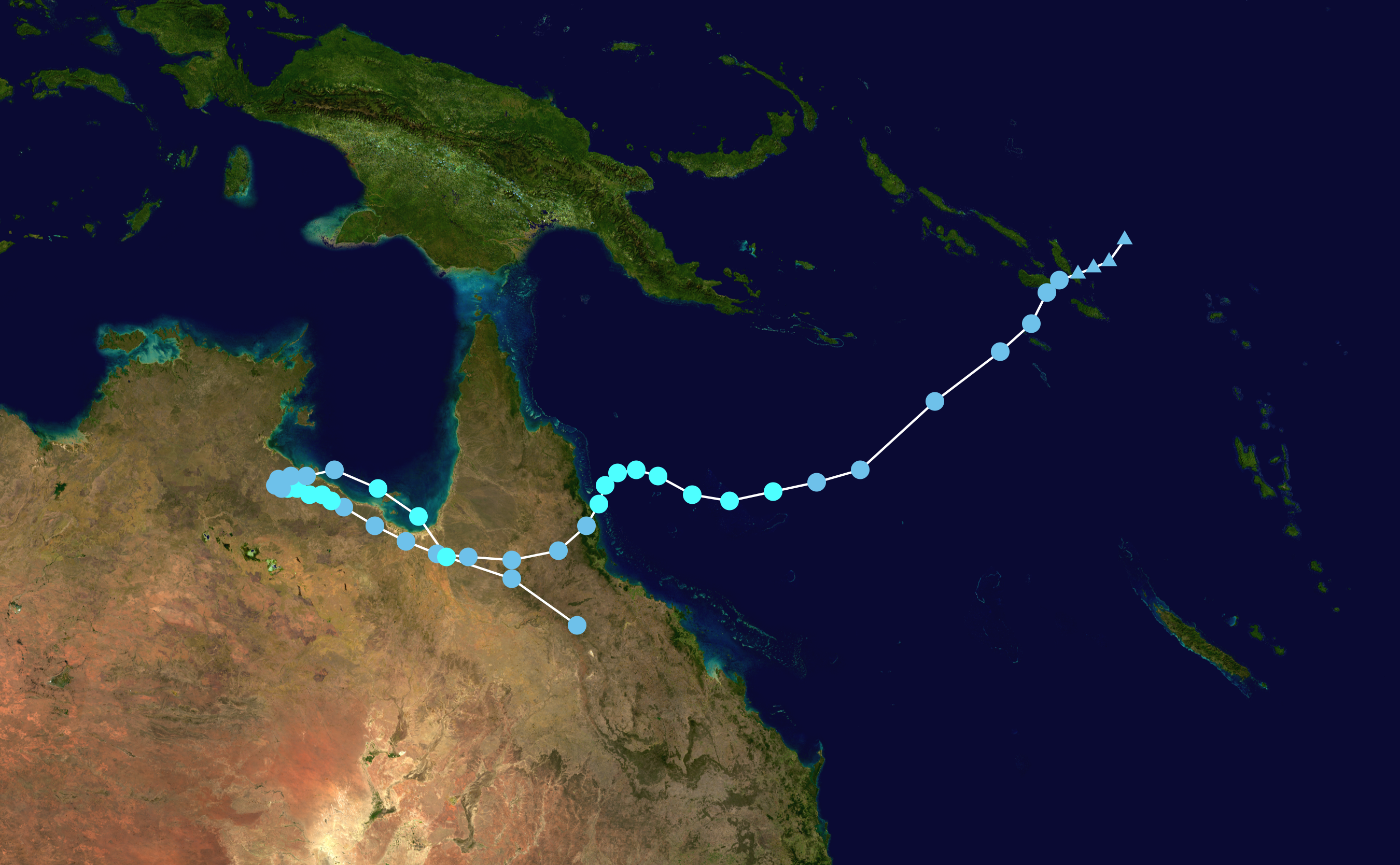
- Duration: January 18 – January 20 (left basin)
- Peak intensity: Winds not specified; 1002 hPa (mbar)

Tropical Disturbance 04F formed on January 18 and strengthened to a Tropical Depression as it moved south-west through the Solomon Islands. On January 20 it crossed the 160°E meridian into the Australian Basin, where it developed into Tropical Cyclone Olga.

=== Tropical Depression 05F ===
- Tropical depression (Australian scale)
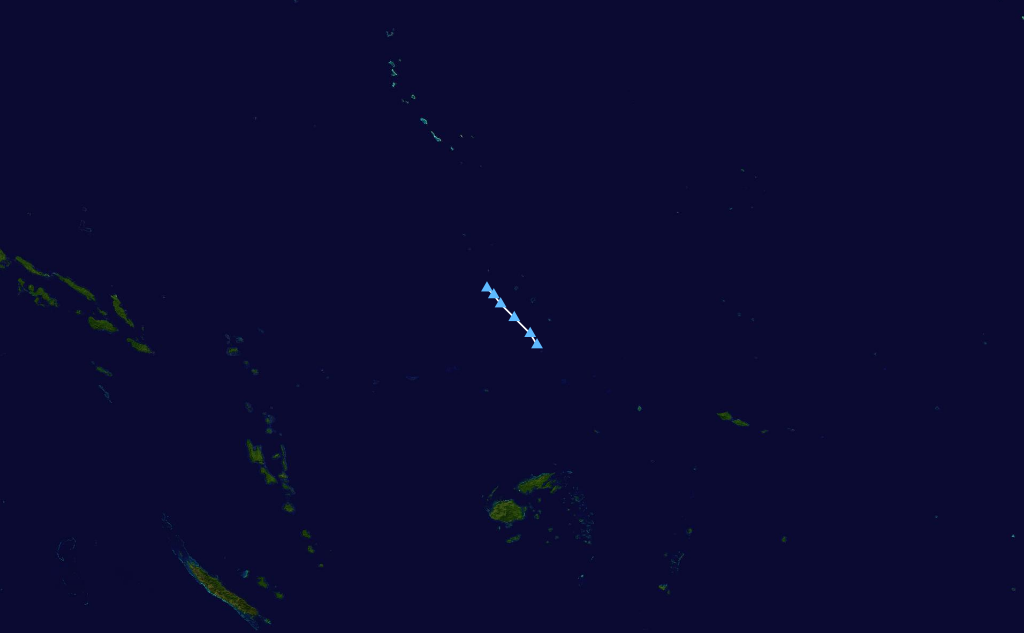
- Duration: January 23 – January 28
- Peak intensity: Winds not specified; 998 hPa (mbar)

Tropical Depression 05F formed on January 23 near 11S 179E, about 200 miles (320 km) south of Funafuti, Tuvalu. It dissipated on January 28.

=== Tropical Cyclone Nisha ===
- Category 1 tropical cyclone (Australian scale)
- Tropical storm (SSHWS)
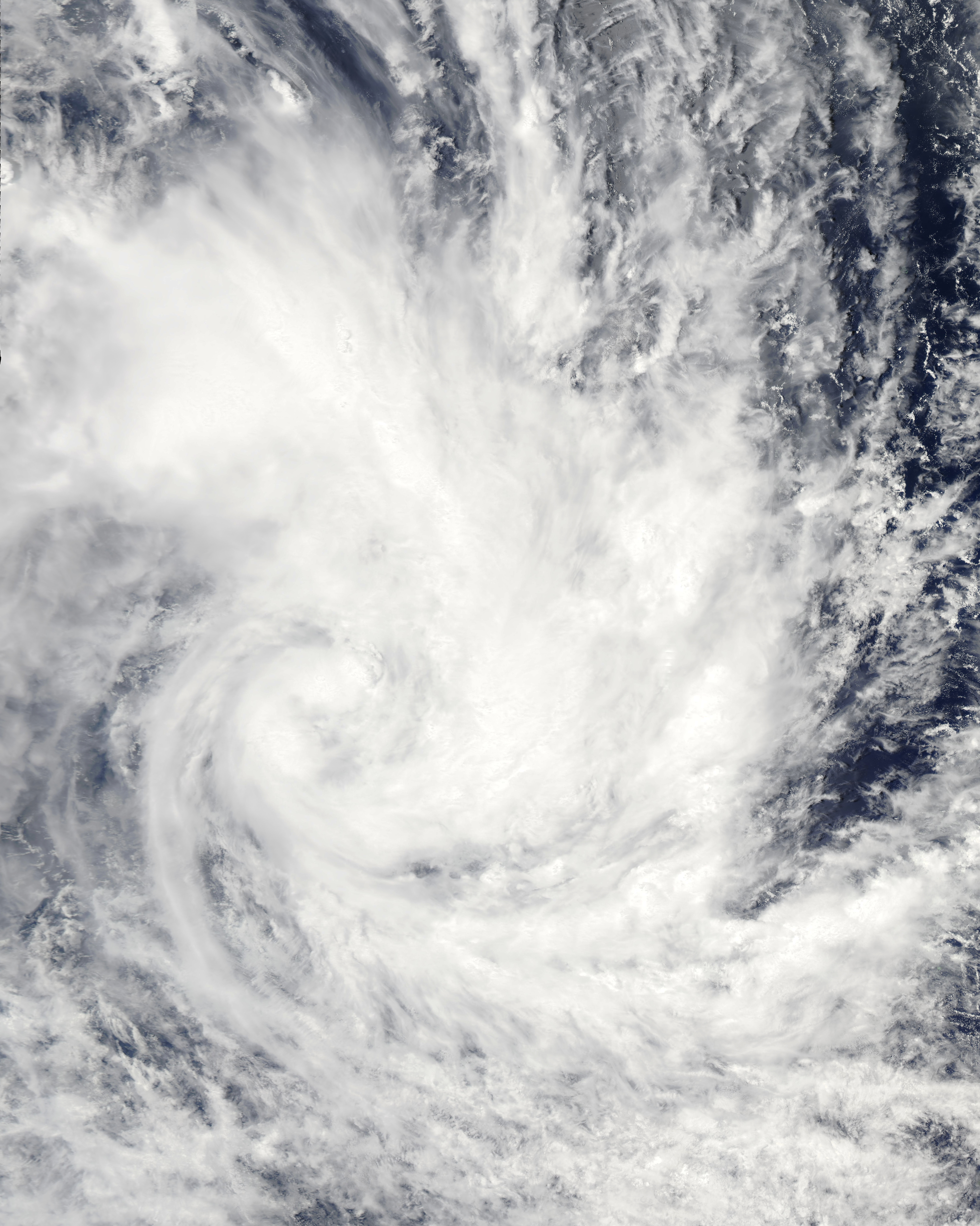
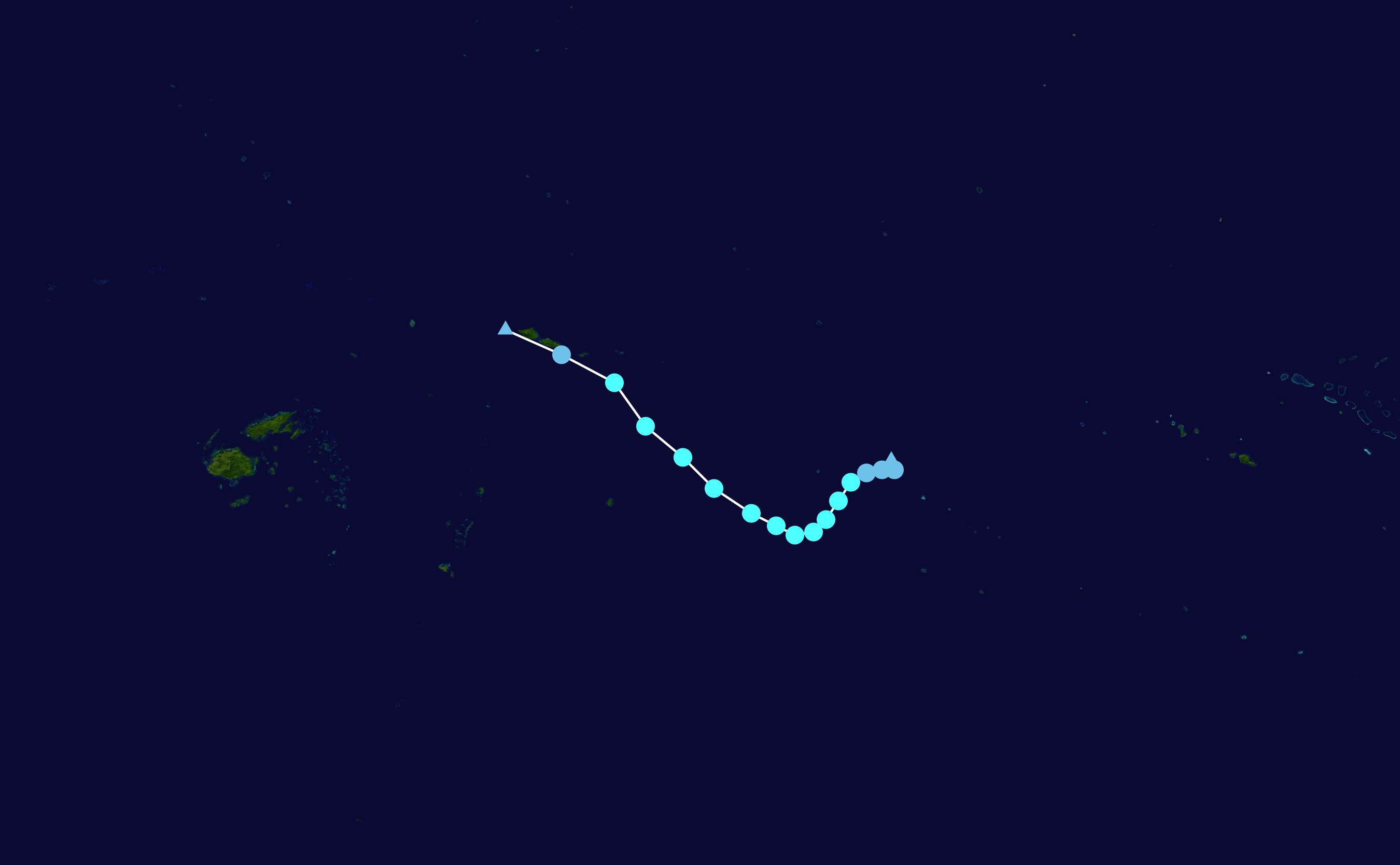
- Duration: January 26 – January 31
- Peak intensity: 75 km/h (45 mph) (10-min); 990 hPa (mbar)

On January 26, the FMS reported that Tropical Depression 06F had developed within a monsoon trough about 55 km (35 mi) to the southeast of Gahi on Wallis Island. Over the next day, atmospheric convection associated with the system significantly increased, deepened and consolidated as it moved southeastwards along the trough and passed within 55 km (35 mi) of Apia, Samoa. As a result, at around 15:00 UTC on January 27, the JTWC initiated advisories on the system and designated it as Tropical Cyclone 10P, while the FMS reported that it had developed into a Category 1 tropical cyclone on the Australian scale and named it Nisha.

=== Severe Tropical Cyclone Oli ===
- Category 4 severe tropical cyclone (Australian scale)
- Category 4 tropical cyclone (SSHWS)
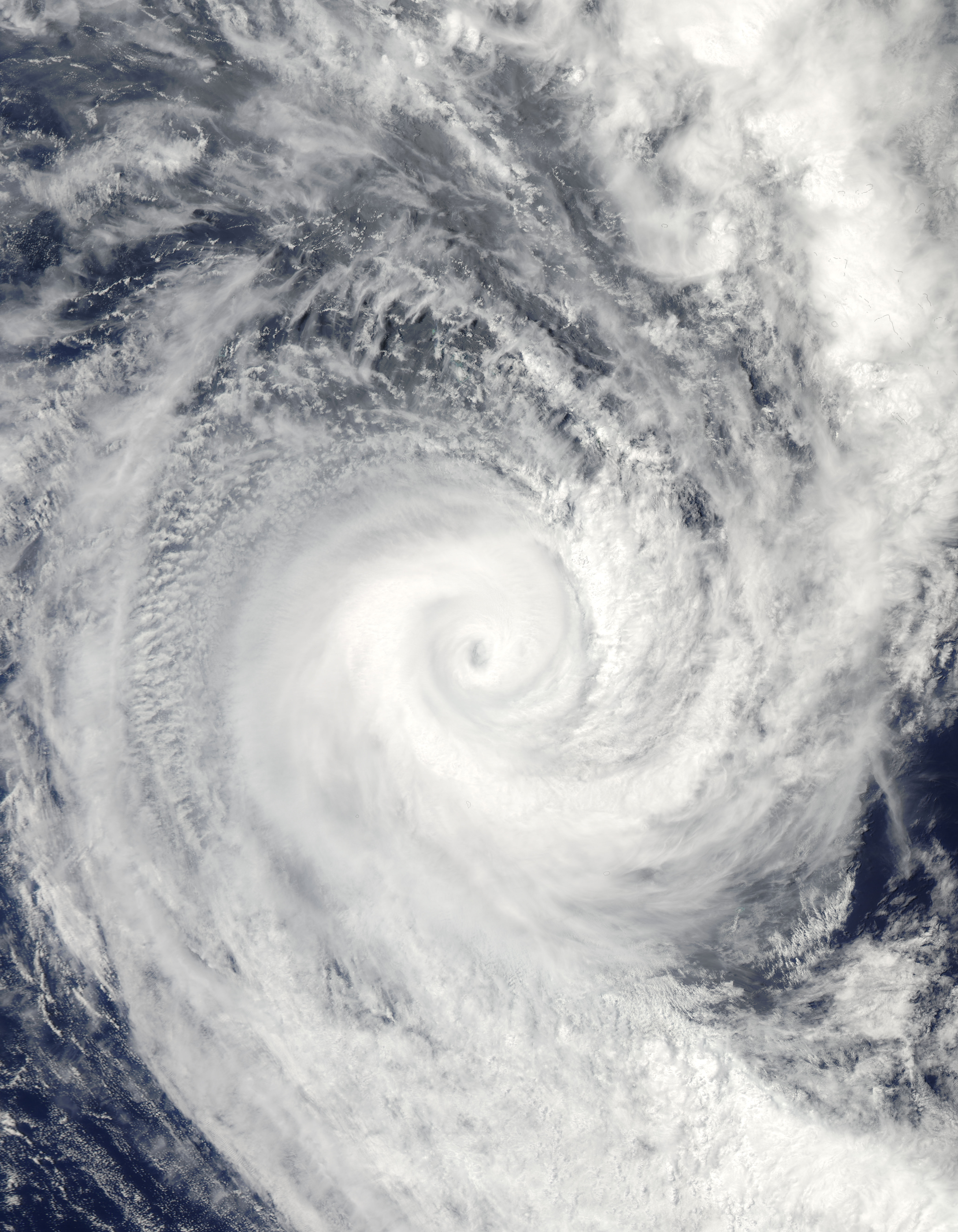
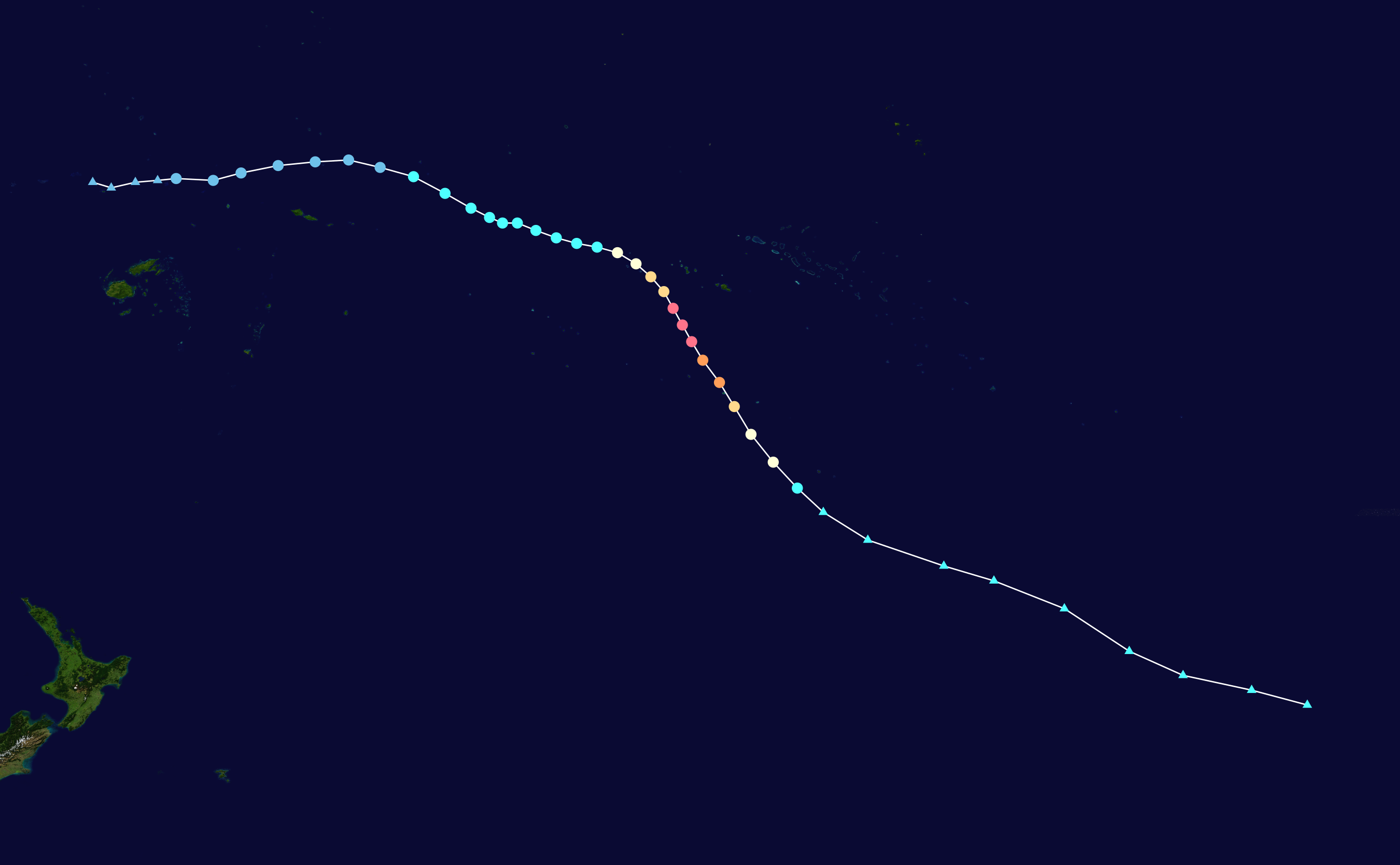
- Duration: January 29 – February 8
- Peak intensity: 185 km/h (115 mph) (10-min); 925 hPa (mbar)

Tropical Disturbance 07F formed on January 29 near 12S 177E. It was upgraded to a depression late on the 30th. On February 1, the JTWC designated 07F as 12P, and the RSMC upgraded it to Tropical Cyclone Oli. On February 3 it strengthened to become the first Severe Tropical Cyclone since Gene in early 2008.

At least one person was killed by large swells produced by the storm in French Polynesia.

=== Tropical Depression 08F ===
- Tropical depression (Australian scale)
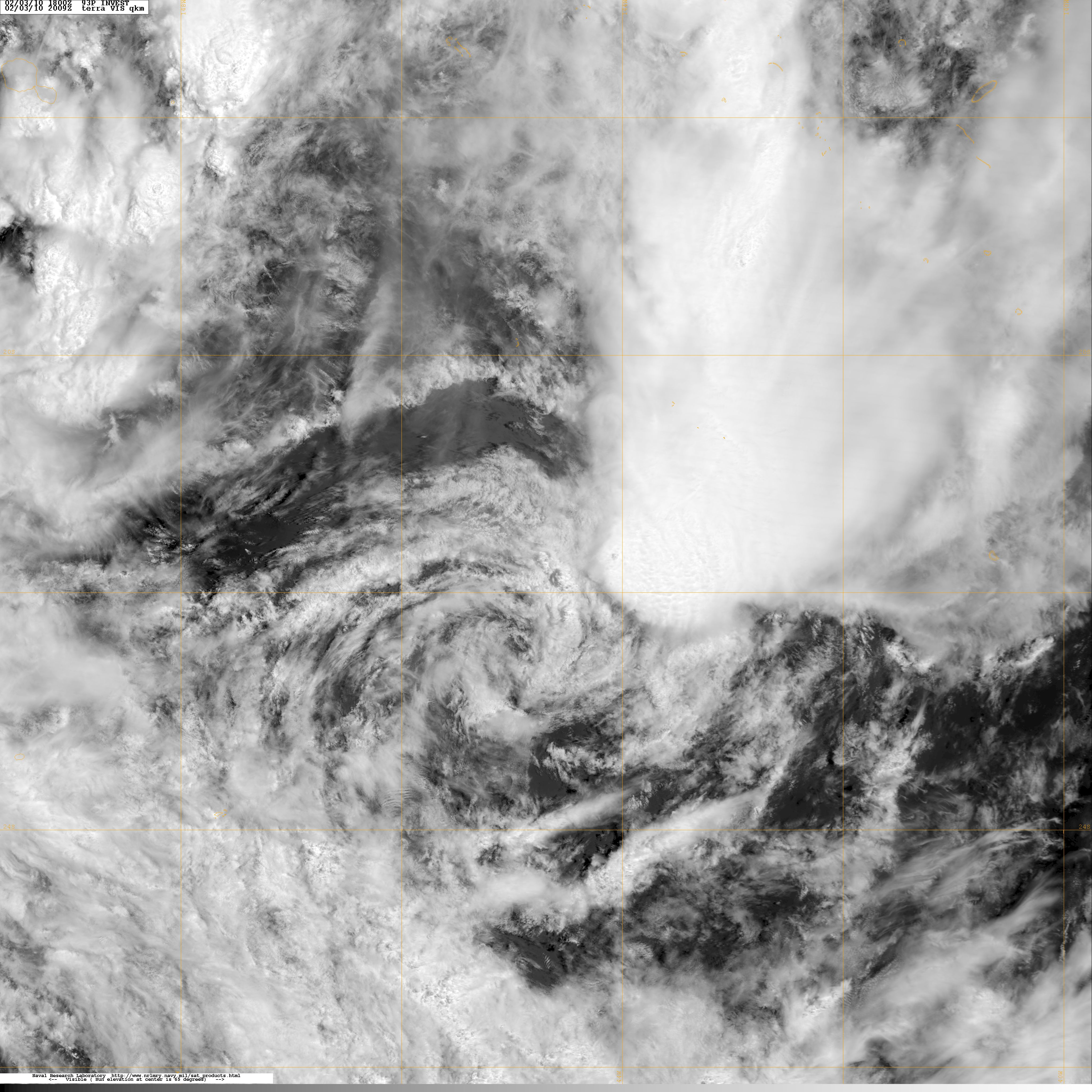
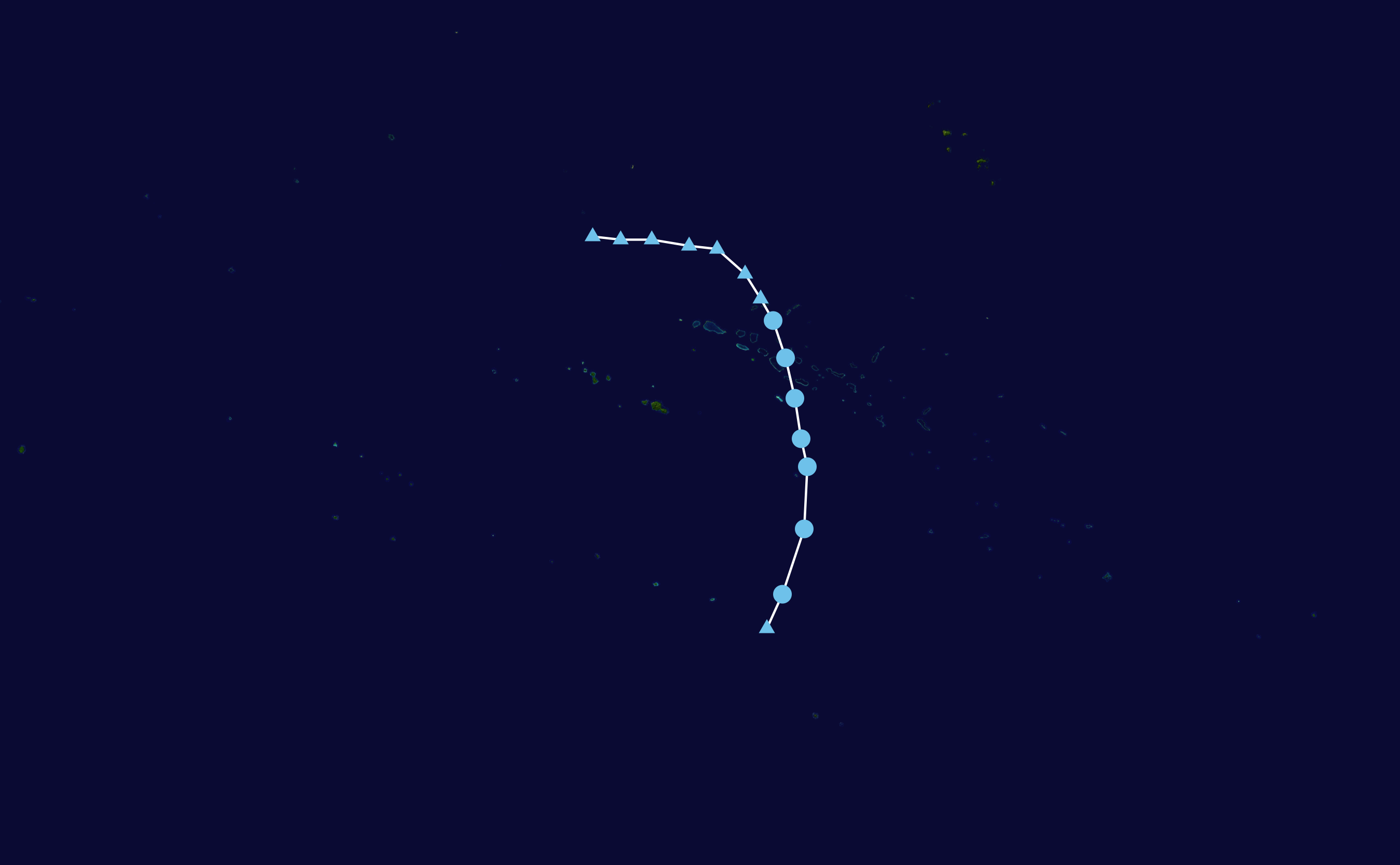
- Duration: February 1 – February 4
- Peak intensity: 55 km/h (35 mph) (10-min); 997 hPa (mbar)

Tropical Depression 08F formed on February 2 near 15S 145W, just south of the King George Islands. However it dissipated on February 4.

=== Severe Tropical Cyclone Pat ===
- Category 3 severe tropical cyclone (Australian scale)
- Category 2 tropical cyclone (SSHWS)
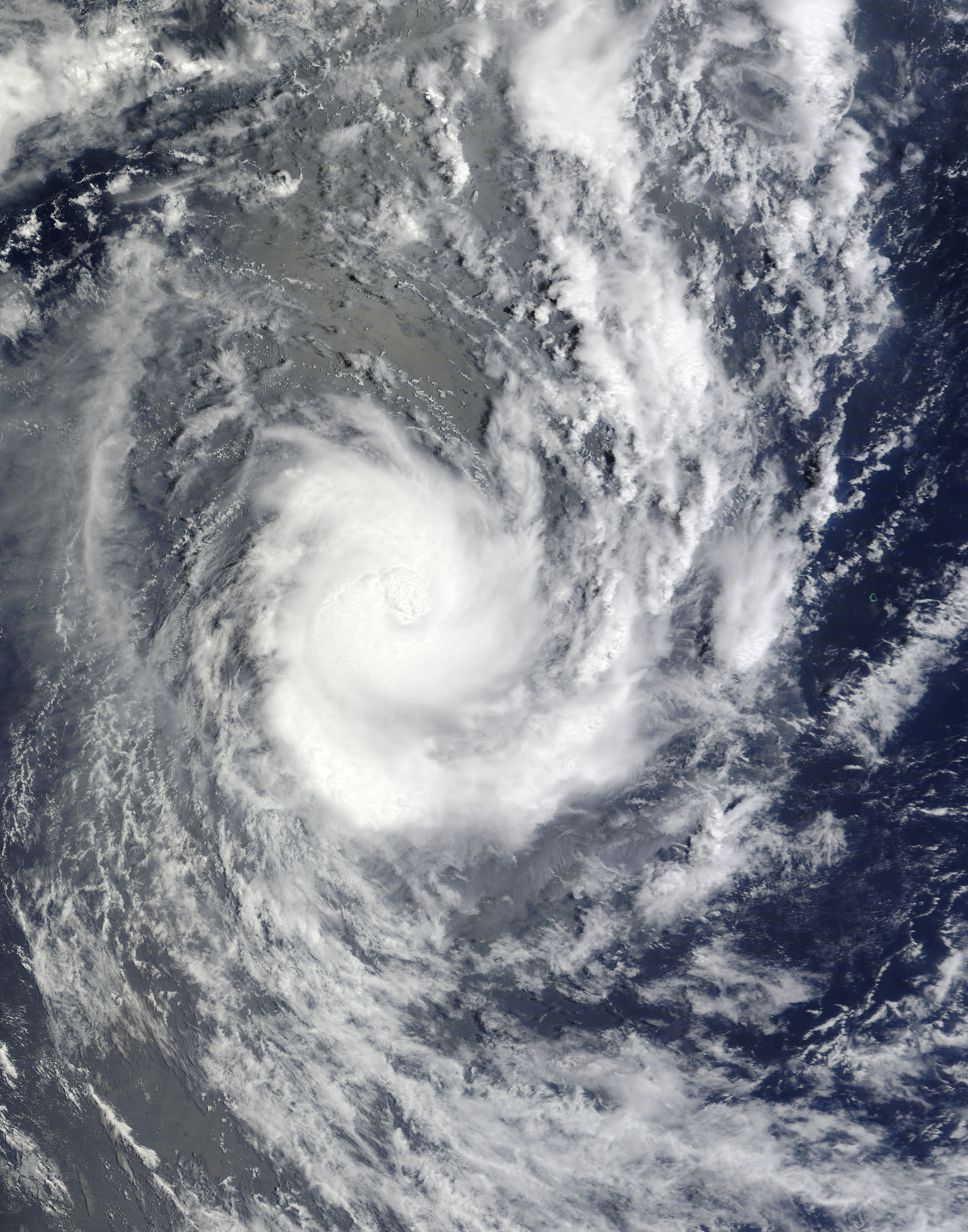
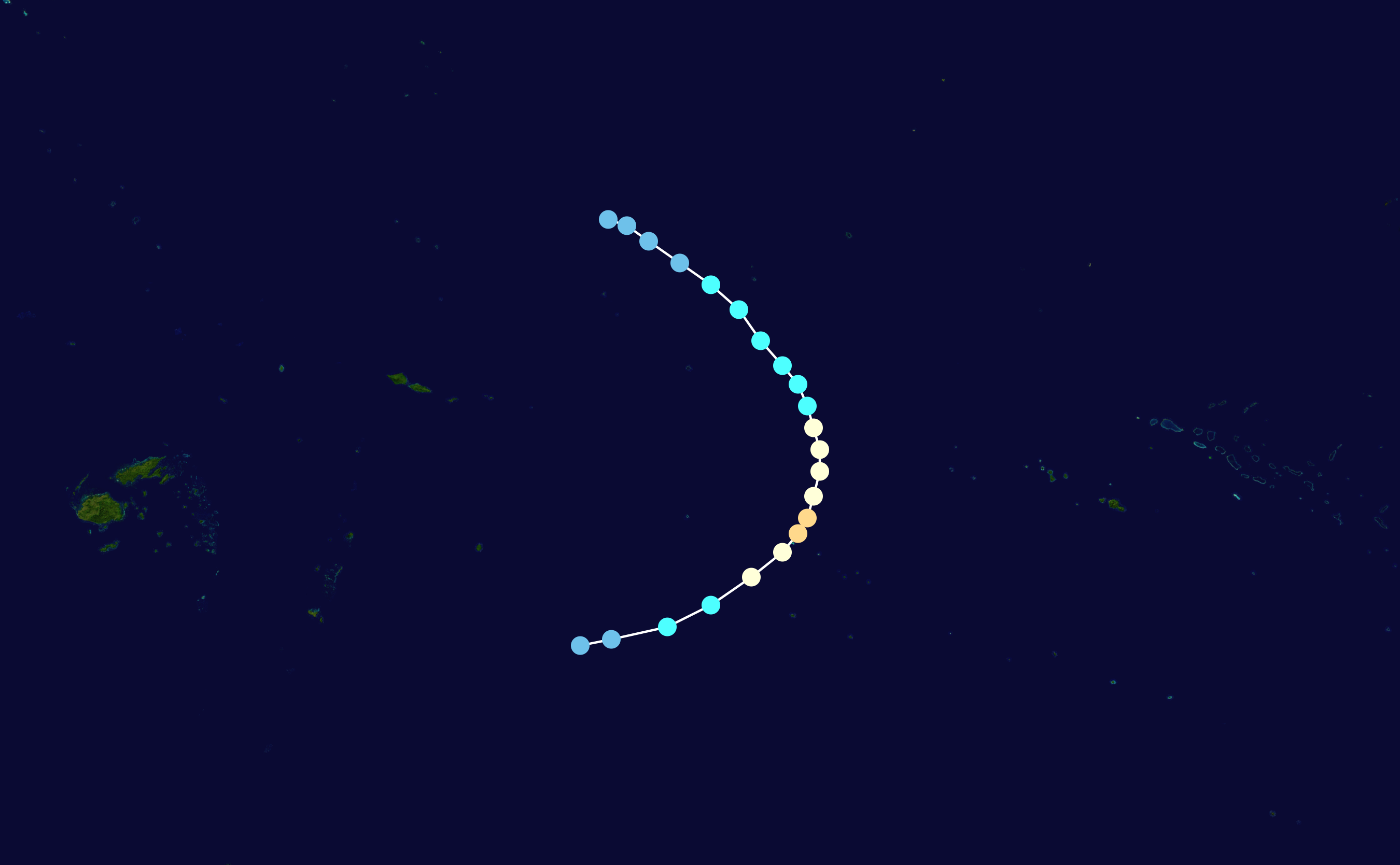
- Duration: February 6 – February 11
- Peak intensity: 140 km/h (85 mph) (10-min); 960 hPa (mbar)

Tropical Depression 09F formed on February 6 near 8ºS 166ºW, about 375 miles (604 km) east of Tokelau. On the 7th, the JTWC designated it as Tropical Cyclone 14P, and on the 8th RSMC upgraded it to become Tropical Cyclone Pat. By the 10th it reached Severe Tropical Cyclone strength as it moved towards the southern Cook Islands, and a hurricane warning was then issued for Aitutaki and its neighbours. The eye of the cyclone was reported to have passed right over Aitutaki, with continuous winds estimated locally at 100 knots for 4 hours. There was extensive damage to housing and a hospital, and the Cook Island government declared a State of Disaster.

=== Severe Tropical Cyclone Rene ===
- Category 3 severe tropical cyclone (Australian scale)
- Category 3 tropical cyclone (SSHWS)
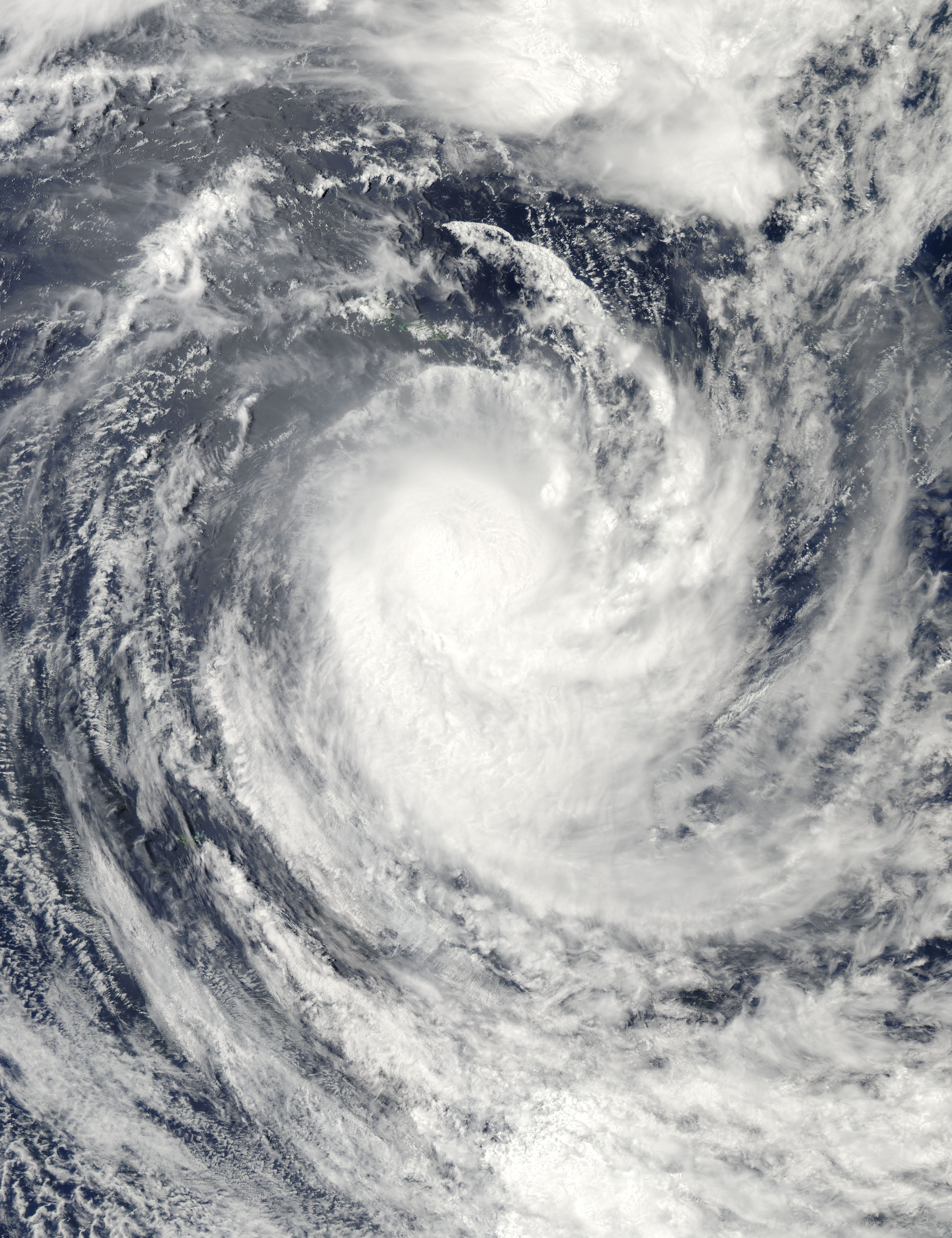
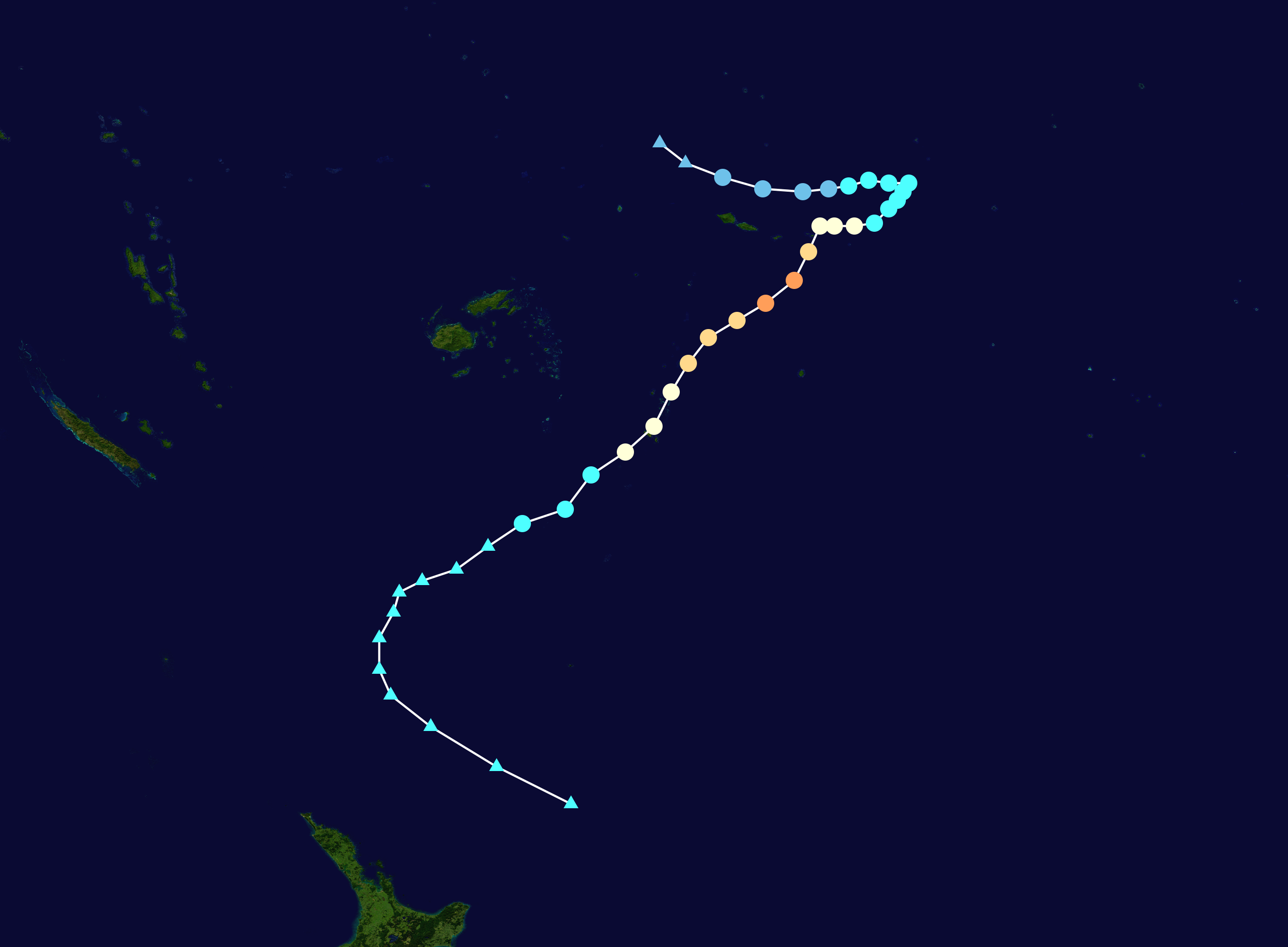
- Duration: February 9 – February 17
- Peak intensity: 155 km/h (100 mph) (10-min); 945 hPa (mbar)

Tropical Depression 10F formed on February 9 near 13S 172W, in the vicinity of Samoa. Late on February 11, RSMC Nadi upgraded the storm to a category 1 cyclone and named it Rene. It continued to strengthen as it moved south of American Samoa, and reached Category 4 on February 14. In American Samoa roads were damaged by landslides caused by the cyclone's heavy rain, and substantial damage was caused to crops. It had weakened to category 3 when it passed through the Vava'u island group of Tonga, and on February 15 the eye was reported to have passed over the Tongan capital Nuku'alofa. The main island of Tongatapu was left without power and water.

=== Tropical Cyclone Sarah ===
- Category 1 tropical cyclone (Australian scale)
- Tropical storm (SSHWS)
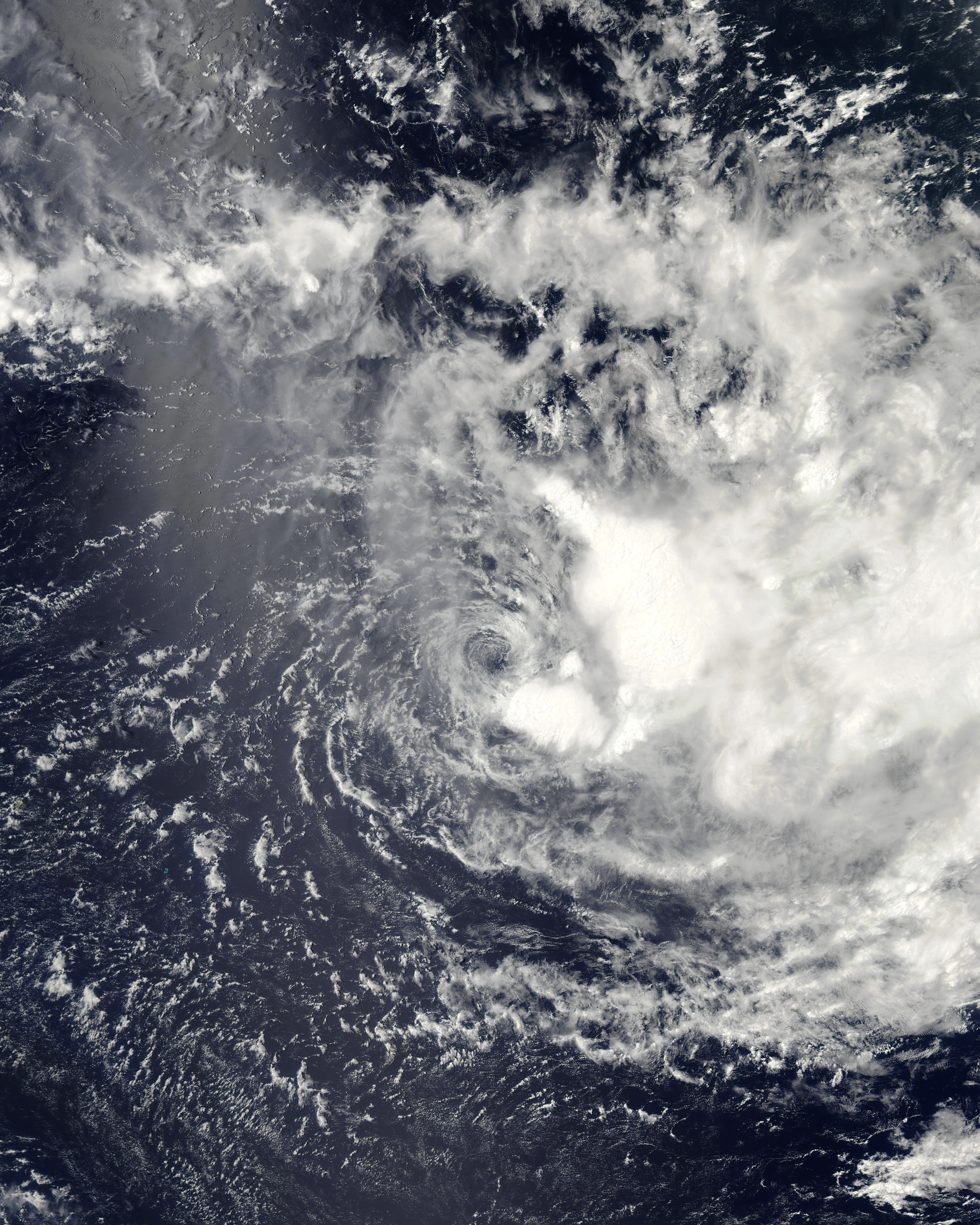
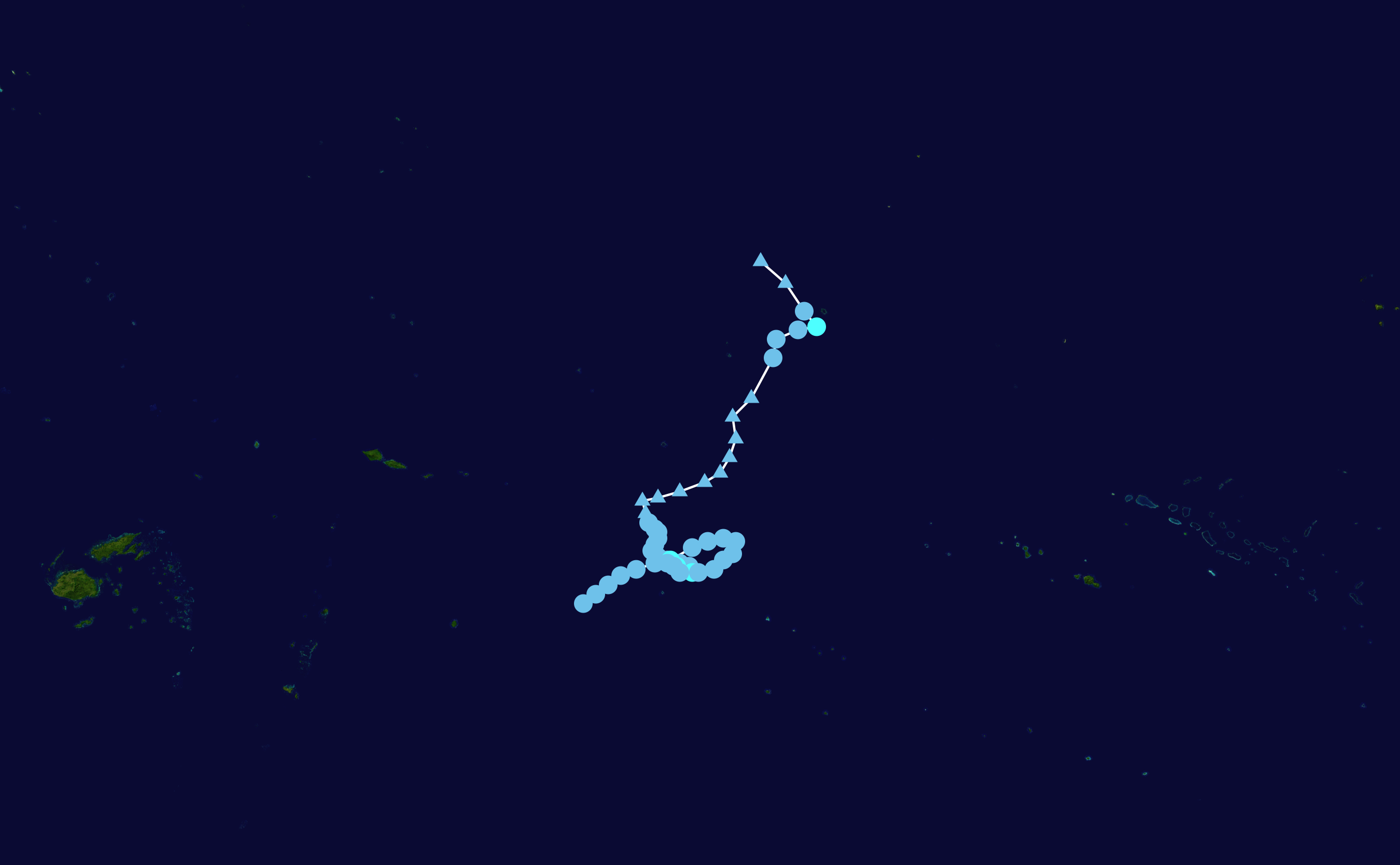
- Duration: February 17 – March 3
- Peak intensity: 65 km/h (40 mph) (10-min); 995 hPa (mbar)

On February 17, RSMC Nadi commenced reporting on an unnumbered tropical disturbance located near 8.6ºS 162.0ºW, about 120 miles (190 km) north-northwest of Rakahanga in the Cook Islands. RSMC Nadi reported that the disturbance was moving west while the JTWC reported that the disturbance was moving east. Eventually, they both agreed on which direction it was moving and RSMC Nadi upgraded the disturbance to Tropical Depression 11F. It soon weakened, but remained identifiable until February 22 when it was again classified as a Tropical Depression. On February 26 it was at last upgraded to Tropical Cyclone Sarah and Tropical Storm by JTWC, being then about 90 miles (140 km) north of Palmerston Island.

=== Severe Tropical Cyclone Ului ===
- Category 5 severe tropical cyclone (Australian scale)
- Category 5 tropical cyclone (SSHWS)
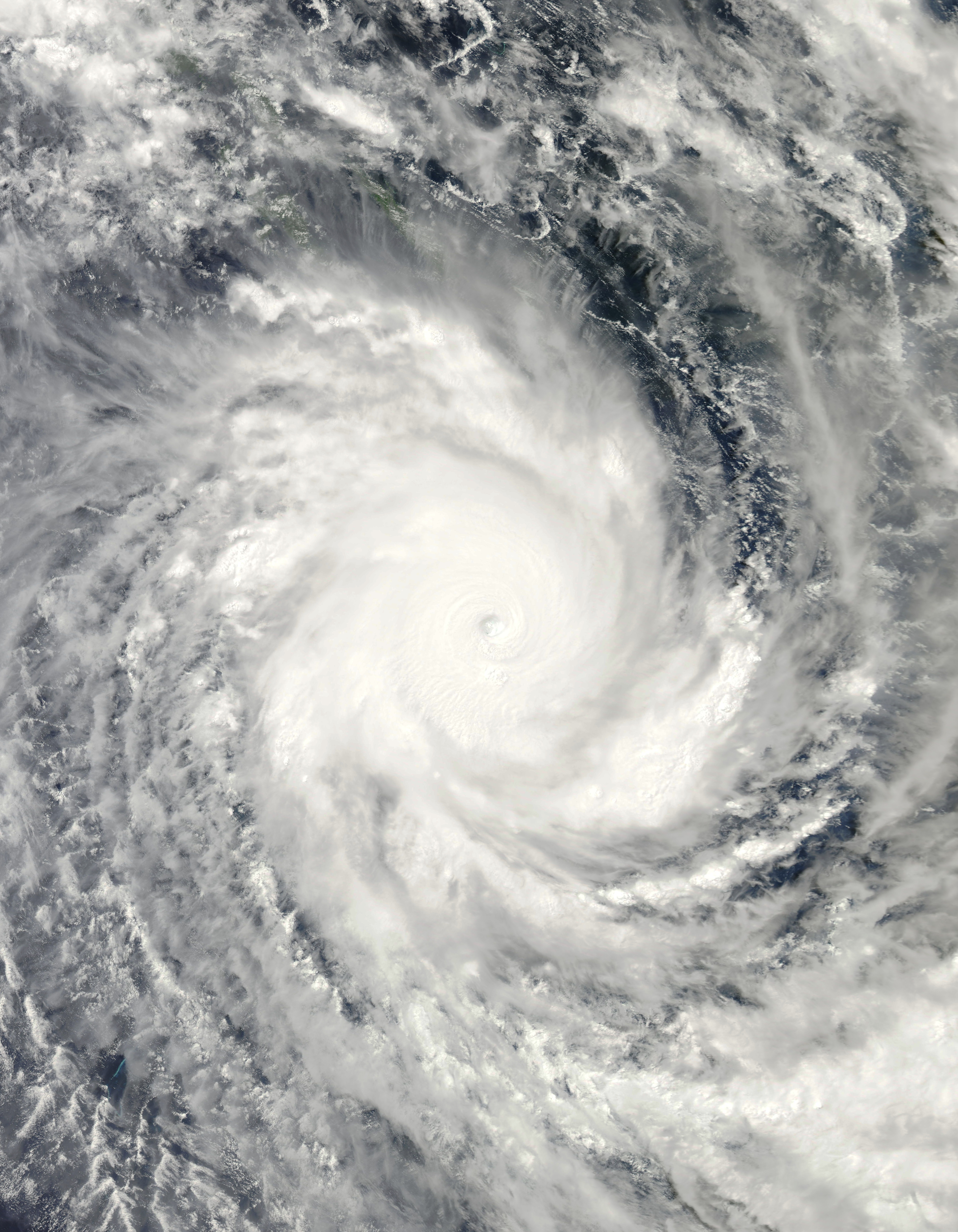
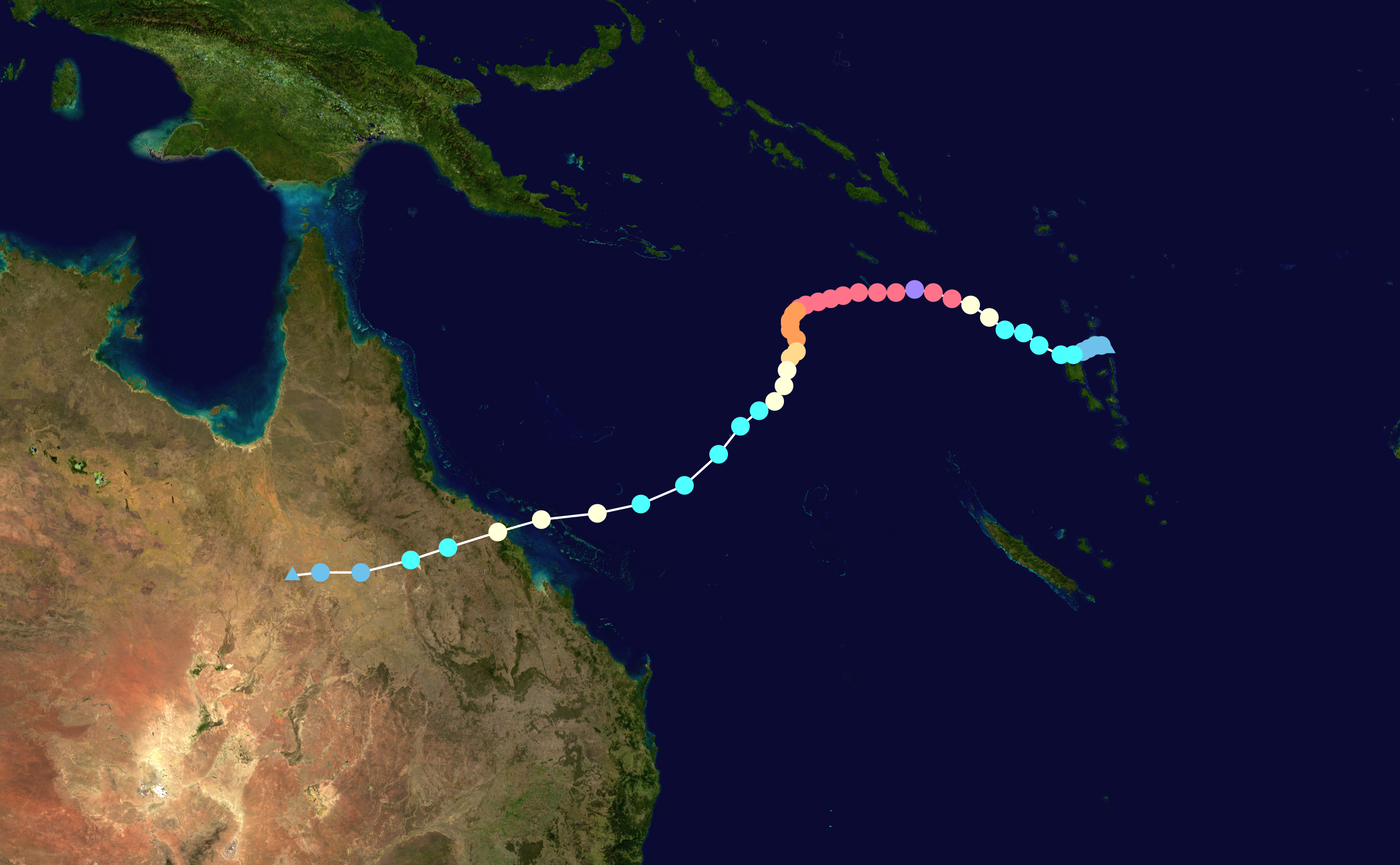
- Duration: March 9 – March 14 (Exited basin)
- Peak intensity: 215 km/h (130 mph) (10-min); 915 hPa (mbar)

Tropical Disturbance 13F formed on March 9 at 12.0ºS 167.0ºE, about 80 miles (130 km) north of Hiw Island, Vanuatu. The next day it was classified as a Tropical Depression. On March 12, 13F was upgraded to Tropical Cyclone Ului. By early on the 13th, it was a category 2 cyclone. Later that day, Ului strengthened into a category 3, making it a severe tropical cyclone. The storm continued to strengthen throughout the day and that night it became a category 5. Ului became the first category 5 South Pacific cyclone since Severe Tropical Cyclone Percy in February 2005. On March 14, Ului exited the Pacific Region and entered the Australian Region.

=== Severe Tropical Cyclone Tomas ===
- Category 4 severe tropical cyclone (Australian scale)
- Category 4 tropical cyclone (SSHWS)
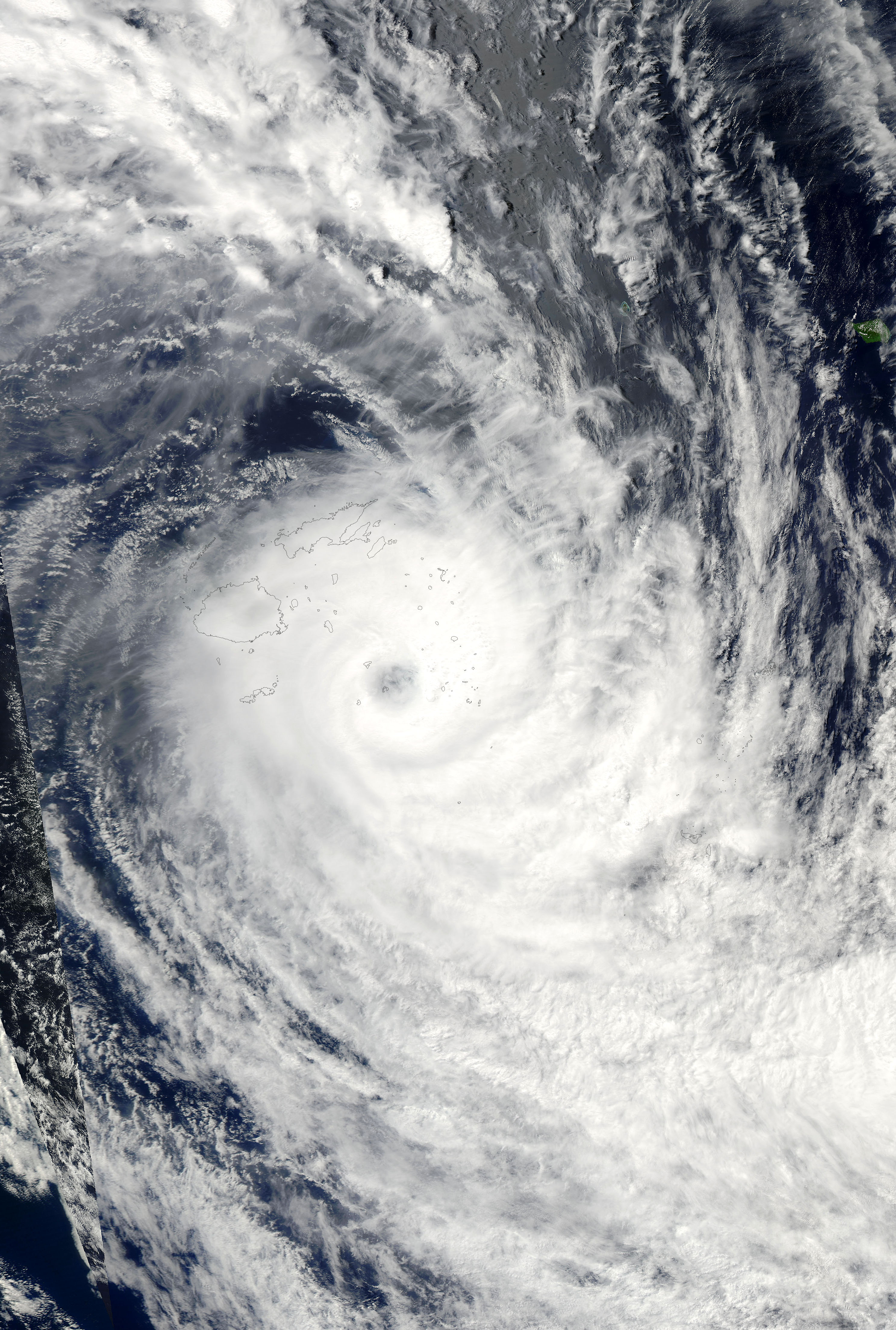
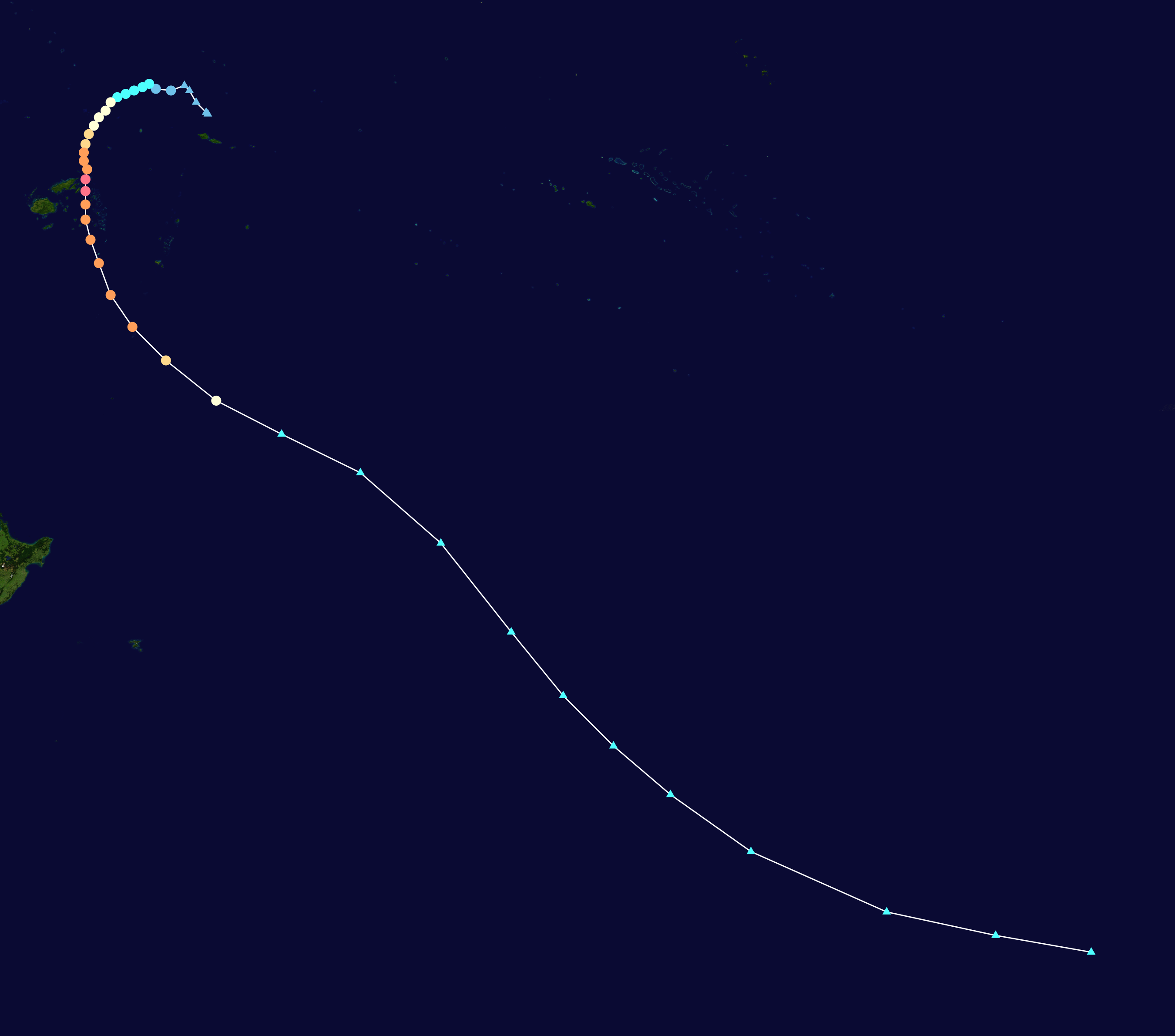
- Duration: March 10 – March 17
- Peak intensity: 185 km/h (115 mph) (10-min); 925 hPa (mbar)

Shortly after the first advisory on Tropical Disturbance 13F was issued on March 9, the FMS began monitoring a new disturbance, designated 14F, further east. The following day, deep convection began to develop around the disturbance's low-level circulation, prompting the JTWC to begin monitoring it for possible cyclonic development. Later on March 10, the FMS upgraded the system to a tropical depression as it continued to become better organized. Located within an environment characterized by low wind shear, further intensification was anticipated as convection continued to develop over the expanding system. Around 1500 UTC on March 11, the JTWC issued their first advisory on the cyclone, classifying it as Tropical Storm 19P. Several hours later, the FMS upgraded the system to a Category 1 cyclone and gave it the name Tomas. Rapid intensification was expected to take place over the following 48 hours as sea surface temperatures ahead of the storm averaged 30 °C (86 °F), well-above the threshold for tropical cyclone development. Throughout the day on March 12, Tomas steadily intensified, and early the next day, the JTWC upgraded the storm to a Category 1 equivalent hurricane with winds of 120 km/h (75 mph).

Convective banding substantially increased on March 13, allowing Tomas to become the fourth severe tropical cyclone of the season early the next morning. Around the same time, the JTWC assessed the storm to have attained winds of 155 km/h (95 mph), ranking it as a Category 2 cyclone. By the afternoon of March 14, Tomas had developed a banding-eye feature surrounded by deep convection. At this point, the FMS assessed the storm to have winds of 150 km/h (95 mph) and a pressure of 950 hPa (mbar). The JTWC also noted further intensification, upgrading Tomas to a Category 3 equivalent storm. Tomas intensified on the night of March 14 and became a Category 4 severe tropical cyclone(according to the Fiji Meteorological Service) with winds up to 170 km/h and gusts up to 215 km/h blowing roofs off some houses and damaging buildings around the eastern side of Vanua Levu.

Throughout Fiji, Cyclone Tomas wrought widespread damage, killing two people and leaving $83.4 million in losses. One person was killed on Vanua Levu after being swept out to sea by large swells while trying to rescue her two sisters, a niece and a nephew near Namilamila Bay.

=== Tropical Depression 15F ===
- Tropical depression (Australian scale)
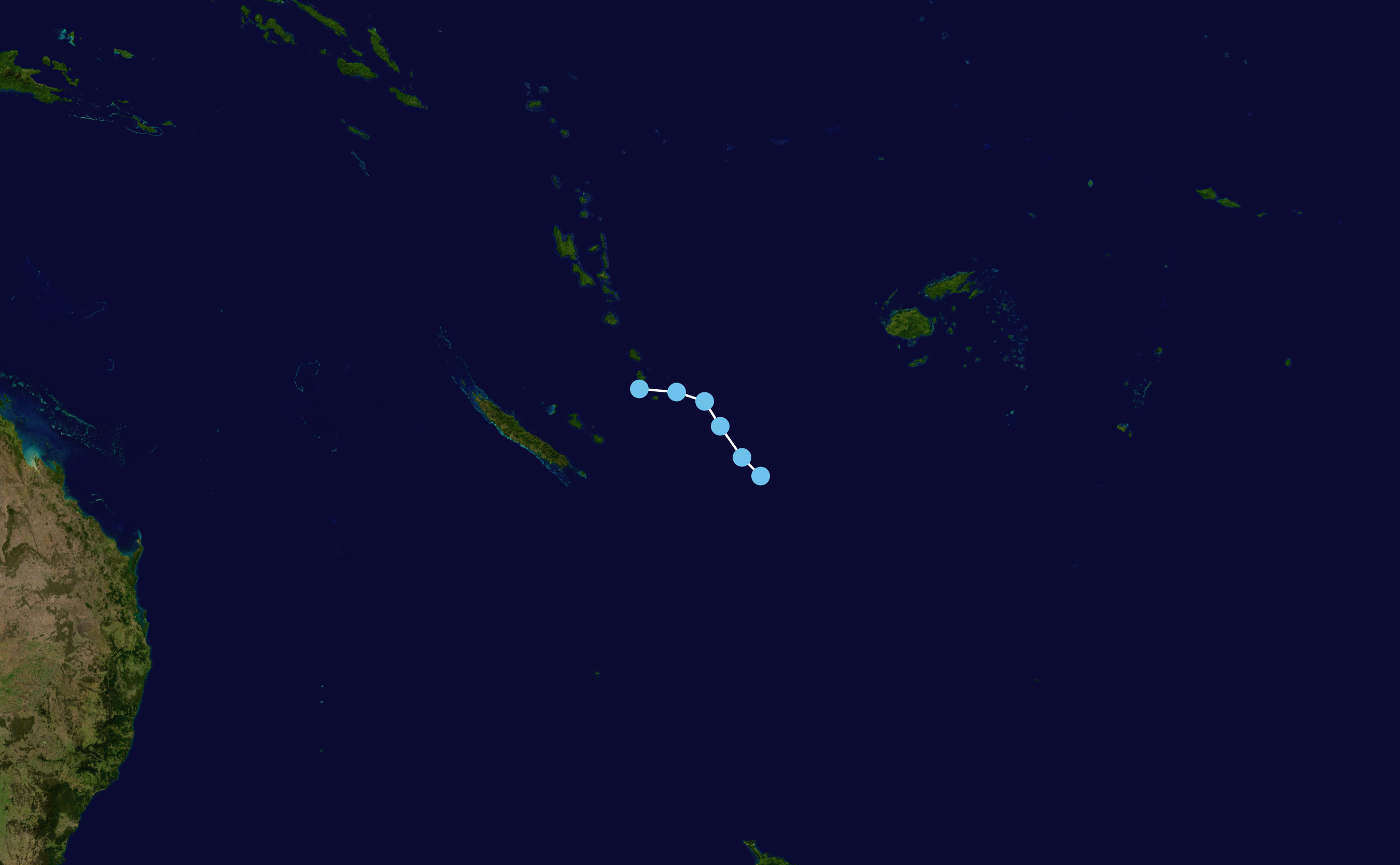
- Duration: March 31 – April 3
- Peak intensity: Winds not specified; 1003 hPa (mbar)

On March 31, the FMS reported that Tropical Depression 15F had developed about 435 km (270 mi) to the northeast of Noumea in New Caledonia. At this time the system lied underneath the jet stream in an area of high vertical wind shear and was poorly organised with atmospheric convection displaced to the south-east of the low-level circulation centre. Over the next couple of days, the system moved south-eastwards and became sheared, before it was last noted by the FMS on April 3. The depression caused heavy rainfall to be reported across the majority of Fiji.

=== Other systems ===
The following weak tropical disturbances and depressions were also monitored by RSMC Nadi, however these systems were either short lived or did not develop significantly. During December 6, Tropical Disturbance 02F developed within a trough of low pressure about 1000 km (620 mi), to the north of Suva, Fiji. Over the next few days, the disturbance moved towards the southeast and remained weak, before it was last noted on December 11 as 01F developed into a tropical depression. Depression 03F, developed on January 7, about 770 km (480 mi) to the southwest of Papeete on the French Polynesian island of Tahiti.

== Season effects ==
This table lists all the storms that developed in the South Pacific to the east of longitude 160°E during the 2009–2010 season. It includes their intensity on the Australian Tropical cyclone intensity scale, duration, name, landfalls, deaths, and damages. All data is taken from RSMC Nadi and or TCWC Wellington. The Damage figures are all 2010 USD

Name	Dates	Peak intensity			Areas affected	Damage (USD)	Deaths	Ref(s).
Name	Dates	Category	Wind speed	Pressure	Areas affected	Damage (USD)	Deaths	Ref(s).
Mick	December 3–15	Category 2 Tropical Cyclone	110 km/h (70 mph)	975 hPa (28.79 inHg)	Fiji	33 million	3	
02F	December 6–12	Tropical Disturbance	Not Specified	1003 hPa (29.62 inHg)	None	None	None	
03F	January 7–10	Depression	65 km/h (40 mph)	1002 hPa (29.59 inHg)	French Polynesia, Southern Cook Islands	None	None	
Olga	January 18–21	Tropical Depression	Unknown	1002 hPa (29.59 inHg)	Solomon Islands	Unknown	2	
05F	January 23–28	Tropical Depression	N/A	998 hPa (29.47 inHg)	None	None	None	
Nisha	January 27–31	Category 1 tropical cyclone	75 km/h (45 mph)	990 hPa (29.23 inHg)	Samoan Islands, Southern Cook Islands	None	None	
Oli	January 29 – February 7	Category 4 severe tropical cyclone	185 km/h (115 mph)	925 hPa (27.32 inHg)	Samoan Islands, Cook Islands, French Polynesia	$70 million	1	
08F	February 2–4	Tropical Depression	55 km/h (35 mph)	997 hPa (29.44 inHg)	French Polynesia, Southern Cook Islands	None	None	
Pat	February 6–11	Category 3 severe tropical cyclone	140 km/h (85 mph)	960 hPa (28.35 inHg)	Cook Islands	$13.7 million	None	
Rene	February 9–17	Category 3 severe tropical cyclone	155 km/h (95 mph)	945 hPa (27.91 inHg)	Samoan islands, Tonga	$18 million	None	
Sarah	February 17 – March 3	Category 1 tropical cyclone	65 km/h (40 mph)	995 hPa (29.38 inHg)	Cook Islands	Unknown	None	
12F	February 2010	Tropical Disturbance	Unknown	Unknown	None	None	None	
Ului	March 9–14	Category 5 severe tropical cyclone	215 km/h (130 mph)	915 hPa (27.02 inHg)	Vanuatu, Solomon Islands	Unknown	1	
Tomas	March 9–17	Category 4 severe tropical cyclone	185 km/h (115 mph)	925 hPa (27.32 inHg)	Wallis and Futuna, Fiji	$45 million	3	
15F	March 31 – April 3	Tropical Depression	Not specified	1003 hPa (29.62 inHg)	Fiji	None	None	
Season aggregates
15 systems	December 3 – April 5		215 km/h (135 mph)	925 hPa (27.32 inHg)		>$165 million	10	

== See also ==
- List of Southern Hemisphere cyclone seasons
- Tropical cyclones in 2009 and 2010
- Atlantic hurricane seasons: 2009, 2010
- Pacific hurricane seasons: 2009, 2010
- Pacific typhoon seasons: 2009, 2010
- North Indian Ocean cyclone seasons: 2009, 2010
