= Mount Wonvara =

Coordinates: 13°09′40″S 166°33′44″E

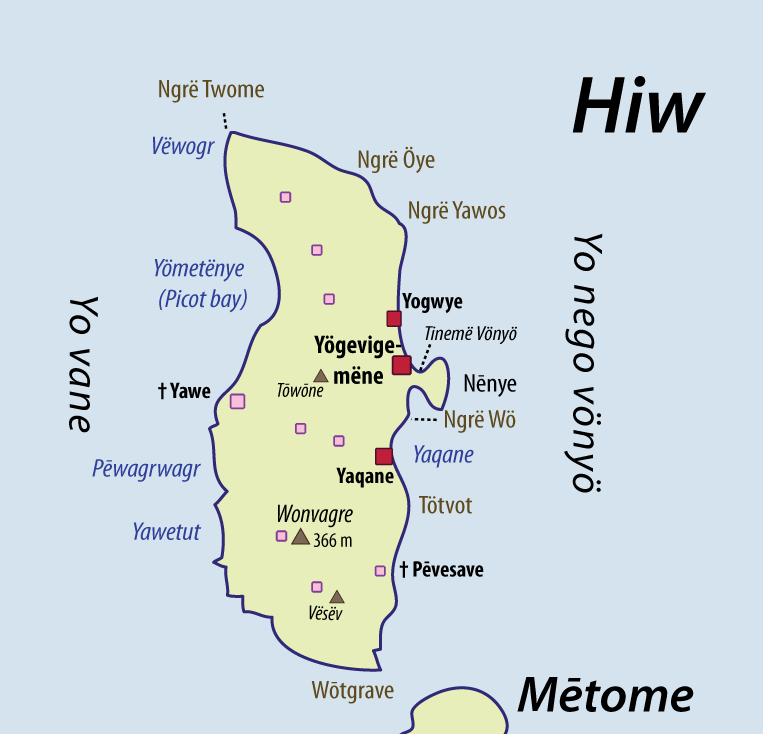
Map of the island of Hiw

Mount Wonvara or Wonvagre (Hiw: Wōnvar̄e [wonˈβaᶢʟə]) is the highest point of Hiw, the northernmost island of Vanuatu. It has an elevation of 366 metres (1,201 ft).
