= Hiw (island) =

Northernmost island in Vanuatu

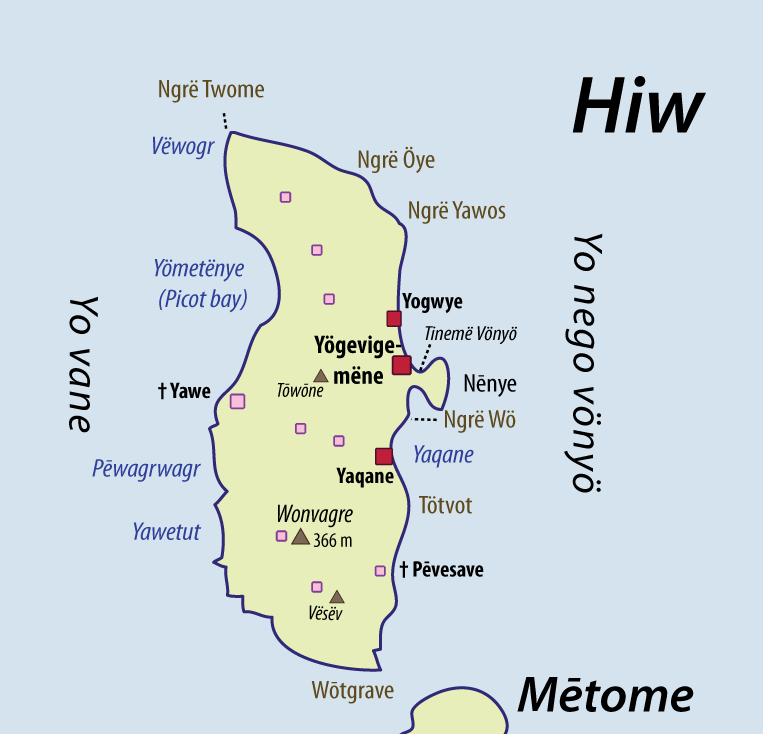
- A detailed map of Hiw, showing modern villages (red) and ancient, now uninhabited villages (pink)

- Location within Vanuatu

Geography
- Location: Pacific Ocean
- Coordinates: 13°08′S 166°33′E
- Archipelago: Vanuatu, Torres Islands
- Area: 47.4 km^{2} (18.3 sq mi)
- Highest elevation: 366 m (1201 ft)
- Highest point: Mount Wonvara

Administration
- Vanuatu
- Province: Torba Province

Demographics
- Population: 269 (2009)

Hiw (sometimes spelled Hiu) is an island in the Torres Islands of Torba Province in Vanuatu – the northernmost island of the country.

The island has a humid tropical climate with heavy rainfall; it is characterized by its white sand beaches, thick tree cover, and natural resources.

According to the 2009 Vanuatu census, Hiw has a population of approximately 269 inhabitants, distributed across three villages on the east coast – Yogwye, Yaqane, and Yögevigemëne. The population of Hiw speaks the Hiw language, an endangered language with few native speakers.

== Etymology ==
The island's name Hiw [hiw] is taken from the local indigenous Hiw language. Etymologically, it derives from Proto-Oceanic *sipo in meaning "down", used in its geocentric sense “northwest”.

== Geography ==
Hiw is the largest of the four volcanic islands of the Torres Islands group in Torba Province. It is the northernmost of the islands of Vanuatu, and is situated to the south and east of the Solomon Islands. The island has abundant natural resources, as well as white sandy beaches.

Covering an area of 47.412 km^{2} (18 sq mi), the island is encircled by fringing coral reefs, and has a 43 km (27 mi) coastline. It has dense tropical rain forests that supports ecosystems typical of high-rainfall Pacific islands. Hiw's climate is tropical with high humidity and temperatures. It is a declared terrestrial conservation area. The topography consists of gently sloping hills with rounded tops, with an average elevation of 113 m (371 ft). The highest point is Mount Wonvara at 366 m (1,201 ft).

== Population ==
Hiw had a population of about 269 inhabitants in 2009 spread across three villages, all located on the east coast: Yogwye [ˈjɔɰwjə]; Yaqane [jaˈkʷanə]; and the main village Yögevigemëne [ˌjɵɣəˌβiɣəˈmenə], whose name is sometimes shortened to Yugemëne [ˌjʉɣəˈmenə]. The islanders speak Hiw, an endangered language with a few hundred native speakers.

== Transportation ==
The Torres islands are served by Torres Airport, which is located on the Linua island, south of Hiw. Travel between Hiw and other islands is primarily by speed boats.
