= Vanuatu National Statistics Office =

The Vanuatu National Statistics Office (VNSO) is Vanuatu's official statistical agency. The agency compiles and publishes statistics about the Pacific island nation.

== See also ==
- 2009 Vanuatu Census
- 2016 Vanuatu Mini-Census (in response to Cyclone Pam)
