= 2009 Vanuatu census =

The 2009 census of Vanuatu was conducted on 16 November 2009. The census revealed growth by an average of 2.3 percent a year since the previous census in 1999.

The 2009 census was "the first time the Vanuatu National Statistics Office (VNSO) extensively used geographic information system (GIS) technology for a household survey with the exact location of every household in Vanuatu captured through Global Positioning System (GPS) handsets" and "the first time the VNSO used scanning technology to capture the information from the questionnaires into the computer database."
